= Nowa Góra, Lesser Poland Voivodeship =

Nowa Góra
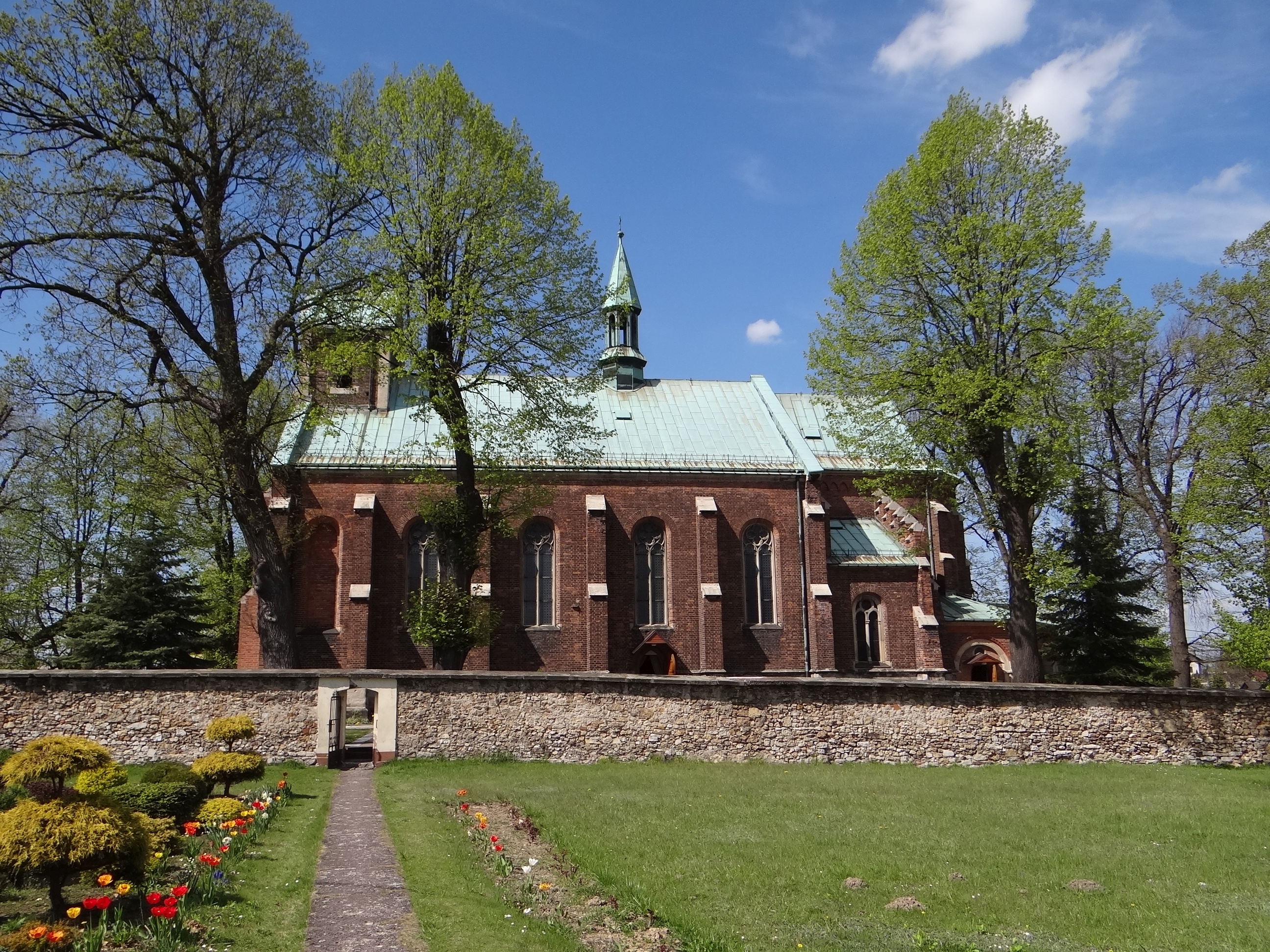
- Church of the Holy Spirit

- Location within Poland
- Coordinates: 50°10′18″N 19°35′24″E
- Country: Poland
- Voivodeship: Lesser Poland
- County: Kraków
- Gmina: Krzeszowice

Population
  - Total: 1,563
- Time zone: UTC+1 (CET)
  - Summer (DST): UTC+2 (CEST)
- Postal code: 32-065
- Area code: +48 12
- Car plates: KRA

Nowa Góra [ˈnɔva ˈɡura] (en. New Mountain) is a village in Poland in Gmina Krzeszowice, Kraków County, Lesser Poland Voivodeship. In the years 1975–1998 it was in Kraków Voivodeship.

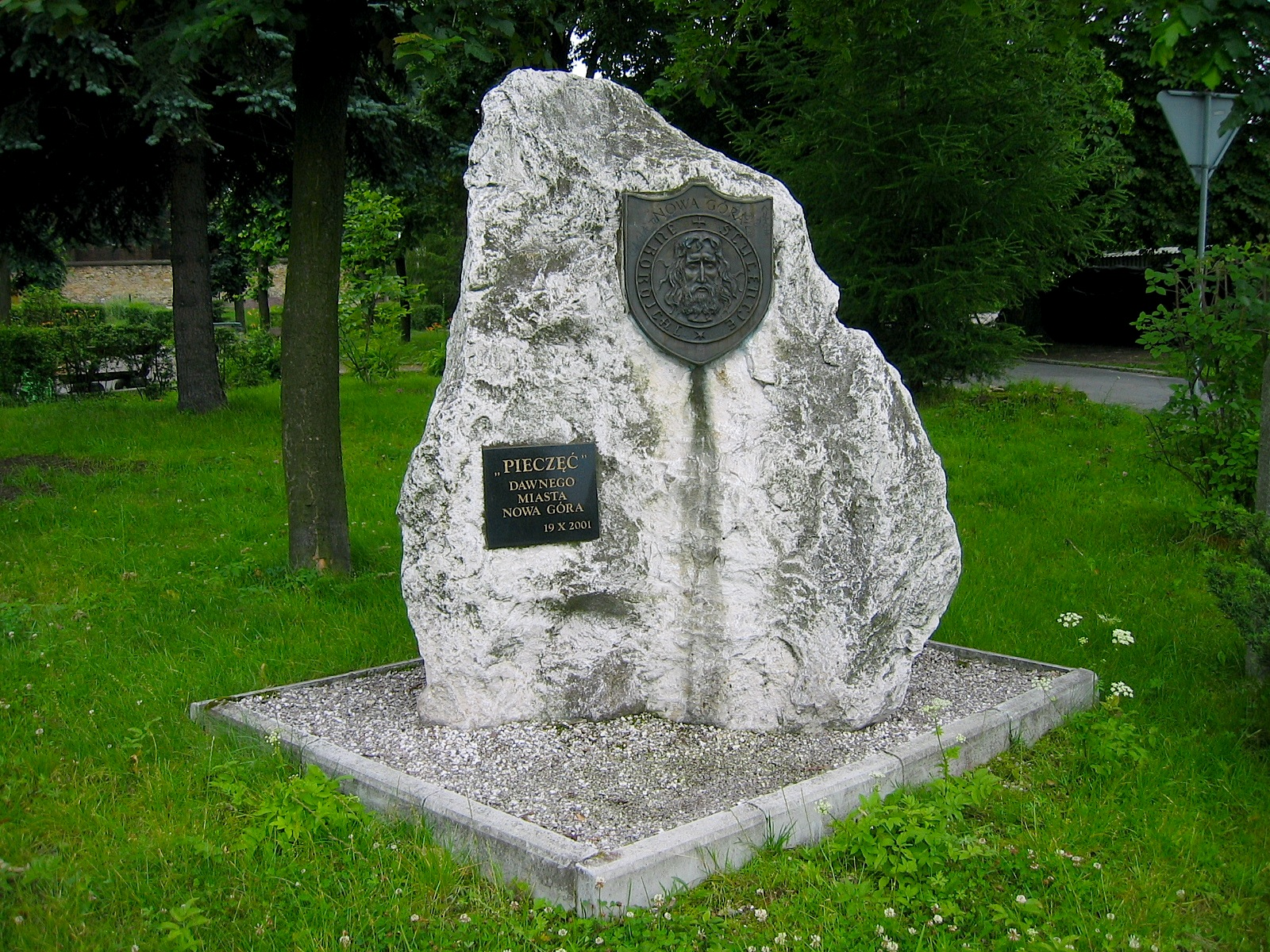
A monument commemorating the ancient town seal of Nowa Góra

A former town, with a noticeable market square. The village was known as Złota Góra until the fire that destroyed the old village. A former lead mine (until 17th-19th century).

Population: 1563.

It has a Catholic church and Jehovah's Witness's Kingdom Hall.

== Name ==
Jan Długosz, in his work Liber beneficiorum dioecesis Cracoviensis (1470–1480), presented the name of the village in two forms: Novomoncze and Nowa Gora.

== History ==
The history of Nowa Gora dates back at least to early 13th century, as the village was burned during the disastrous Mongol invasion of Poland (1240s). Local Roman Catholic parish was established in 1313, and by mid-15th century, Nowa Gora was a Magdeburg rights town: it is called oppidium in Liber Beneficiorum by Jan Długosz, who also wrote that Nowa Gora had a wooden church.

Since Middle Ages, Nowa Gora was known for its rich silver, lead and calamine deposits, with first mines existing here since the late 13th century (in Old Polish, the word "gora" meant both mountain and mine). For this reason, Dutch cartographer Andreas Cellarius mentioned Nowa Gora in his work Descriptio Poloniae, published in 1639 in Amsterdam. In the mid-17th century, iron ore used for cannonballs was excavated in Nowa Gora. Since the town enjoyed special attention of King Jan Kazimierz Waza, a monument of the king was erected at a local market square.

Before the Partitions of Poland, Nowa Gora was an important center of trade and mining, with population of 750. In the early 19th century, the town was part of the Free City of Kraków, which later was annexed into Austrian Galicia. One third of Nowa Gora burned in a great fire in 1801, after which wooden houses were replaced with brick ones. After the fire, however, resulted Nowa Gora completely lost its economic importance. Furthermore, none of the railways built in the 19th century reached the town, to the advantage of nearby Krzeszowice. In search of jobs, residents of Nowa Gora left the town, settling mainly in Siersza and Trzebinia.

Among points of interest, the town has a neo-Gothic parish church (1885–95), founded by the Potocki family, and column-monument of Jan Kazimierz Waza (17th century).
