= Miękinia =

Miękinia may refer to the following places in Poland:

- Miękinia, Lower Silesian Voivodeship (south-west Poland)
- Miękinia, Lesser Poland Voivodeship (south Poland)
