= Sanka (disambiguation) =

Sanka is a brand of instant decaffeinated coffee

It may also refer to:

- Sanka, Lesser Poland Voivodeship, a village in the administrative district of Gmina Krzeszowice, within Kraków County, Lesser Poland Voivodeship, in southern Poland
- Sanka, Hooghly, a village in West Bengal, India
- Sanka (film), a 1972 Japanese film by Kaneto Shindō
- Sanka, a fictional military aircraft model in the Sky Crawlers book series
- Sanka (ethnic group), nomadic people who once lived in the mountains of Japan

== See also ==
- Sankharavam (disambiguation)
- Shankha, conch in Indian religions
- Sankha Lipi, an undeciphered script of India
- Sankham, a 2009 Indian film
- Shankha Ghosh (1932–2021), an Indian poet
- Sankha Kshetra, a holy region of Odisha, India
