= Zalas =

Zalas may refer to the following places:

- Zalas, Lesser Poland Voivodeship (south Poland)
- Zalas, Ostrołęka County in Masovian Voivodeship (east-central Poland)
- Zalas, Wyszków County in Masovian Voivodeship (east-central Poland)
