= Bolęcin =

Bolęcin may refer to the following places:

- Bolęcin, Lesser Poland Voivodeship (south Poland)
- Bolęcin, Płońsk County in Masovian Voivodeship (east-central Poland)
- Bolęcin, Przysucha County in Masovian Voivodeship (east-central Poland)
