= Wola Filipowska =

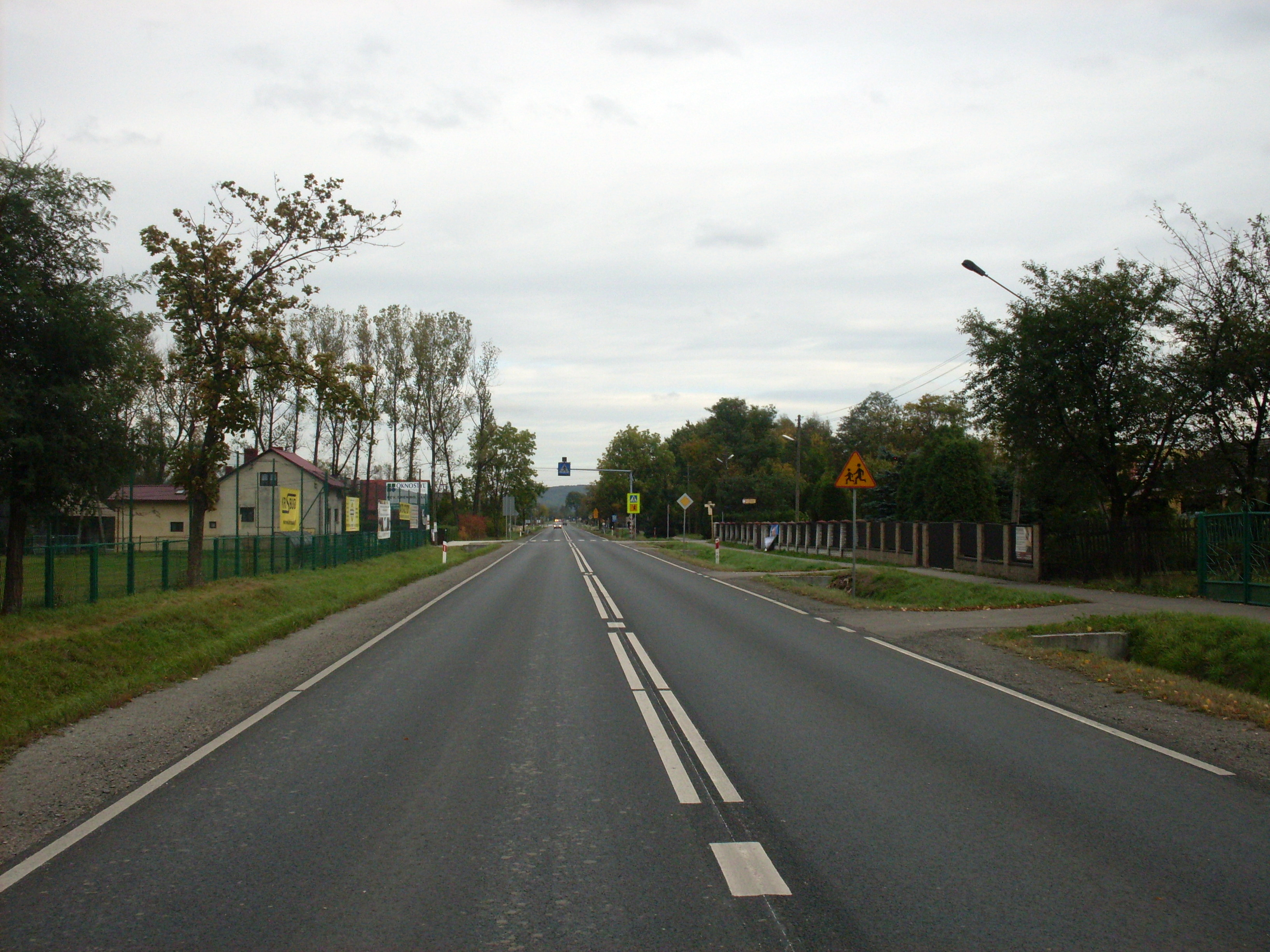
- National road 79 in Wola Filipowska

- Location within Poland
- Coordinates: 50°8′N 19°35′E
- Country: Poland
- Voivodeship: Lesser Poland
- County: Kraków
- Gmina: Krzeszowice

Population
  - Total: 2,636
- Time zone: UTC+1 (CET)
  - Summer (DST): UTC+2 (CEST)
- Postal code: 32-065
- Area code: +48 12
- Car plates: KRA

Wola Filipowska [ˈvɔla filiˈpɔfska] is a village in Poland in Kraków County, Lesser Poland Voivodeship. In the years 1975-1998 it was in Kraków Voivodeship. Wola Filipowska is a small village on the road from Kraków to Trzebinia and is located by the Dulówka river.

- Religions: Roman Catholicism (The Church), Jehovah's Witnesses (1%).
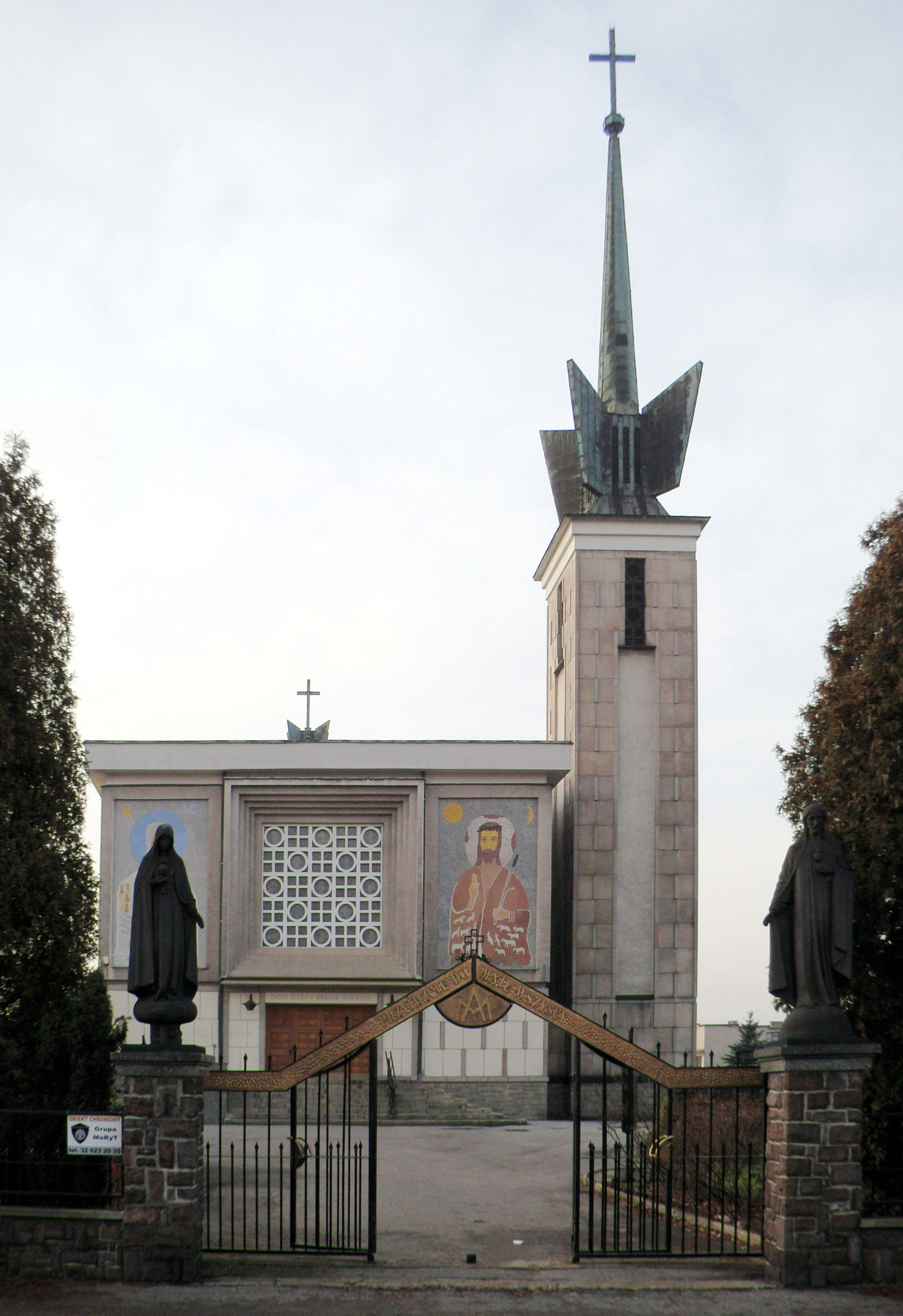
Church of the St. Maksymilian Kolbe

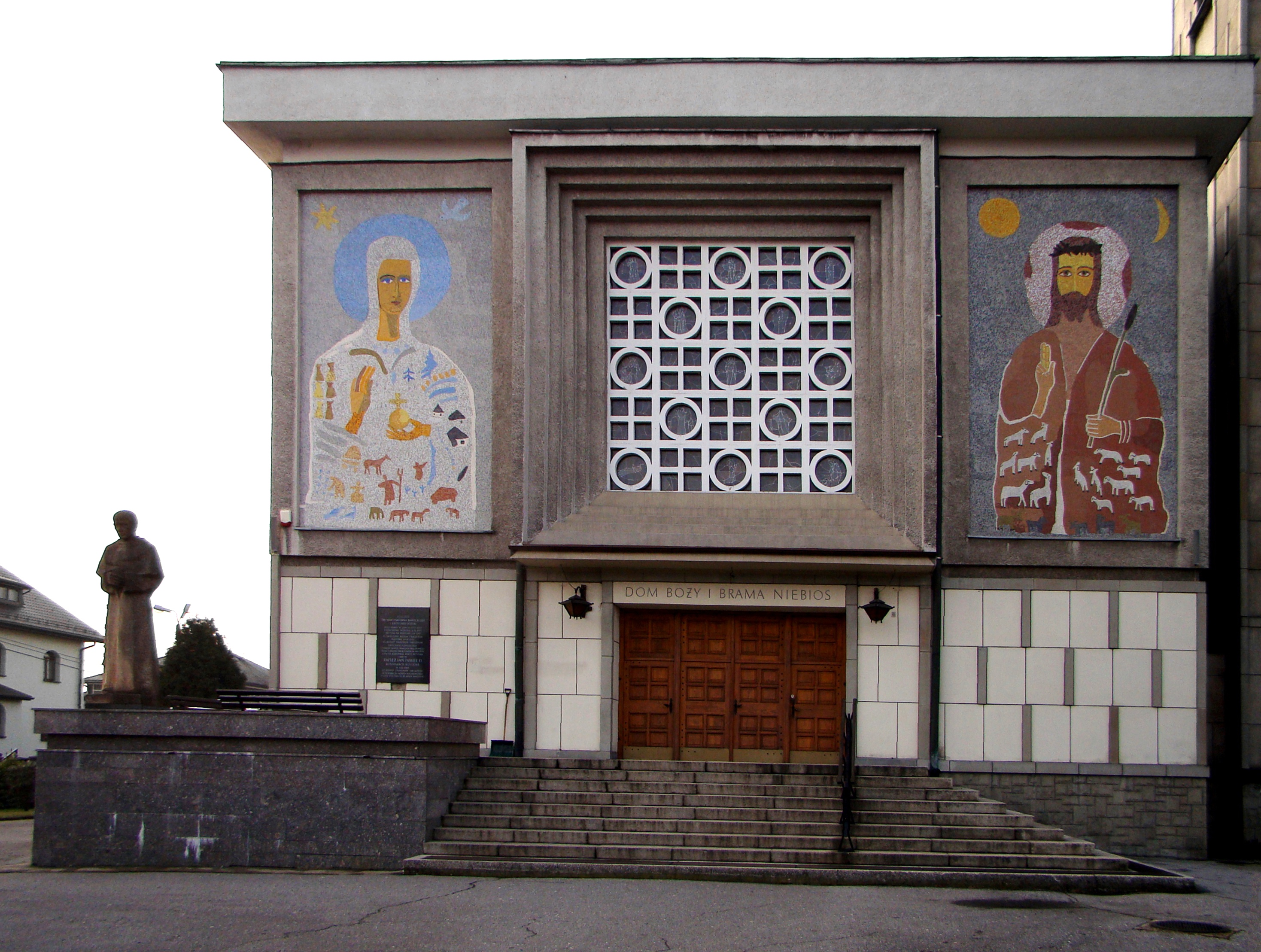
Church of the St. Maksymilian Kolbe

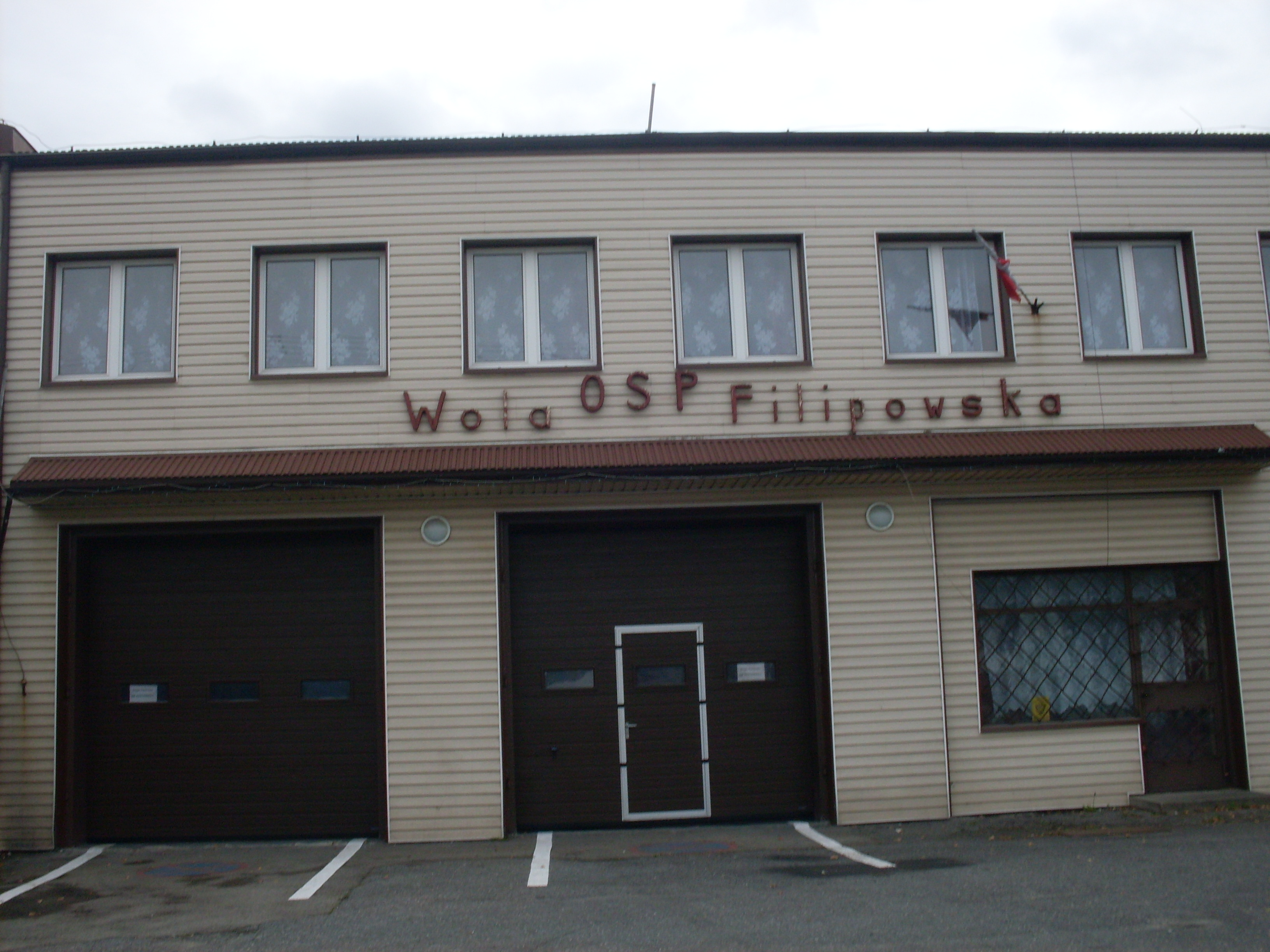
Fire station of Volunteer Fire Department
