= Filipowice, Kraków County =

Filipowice
- Village
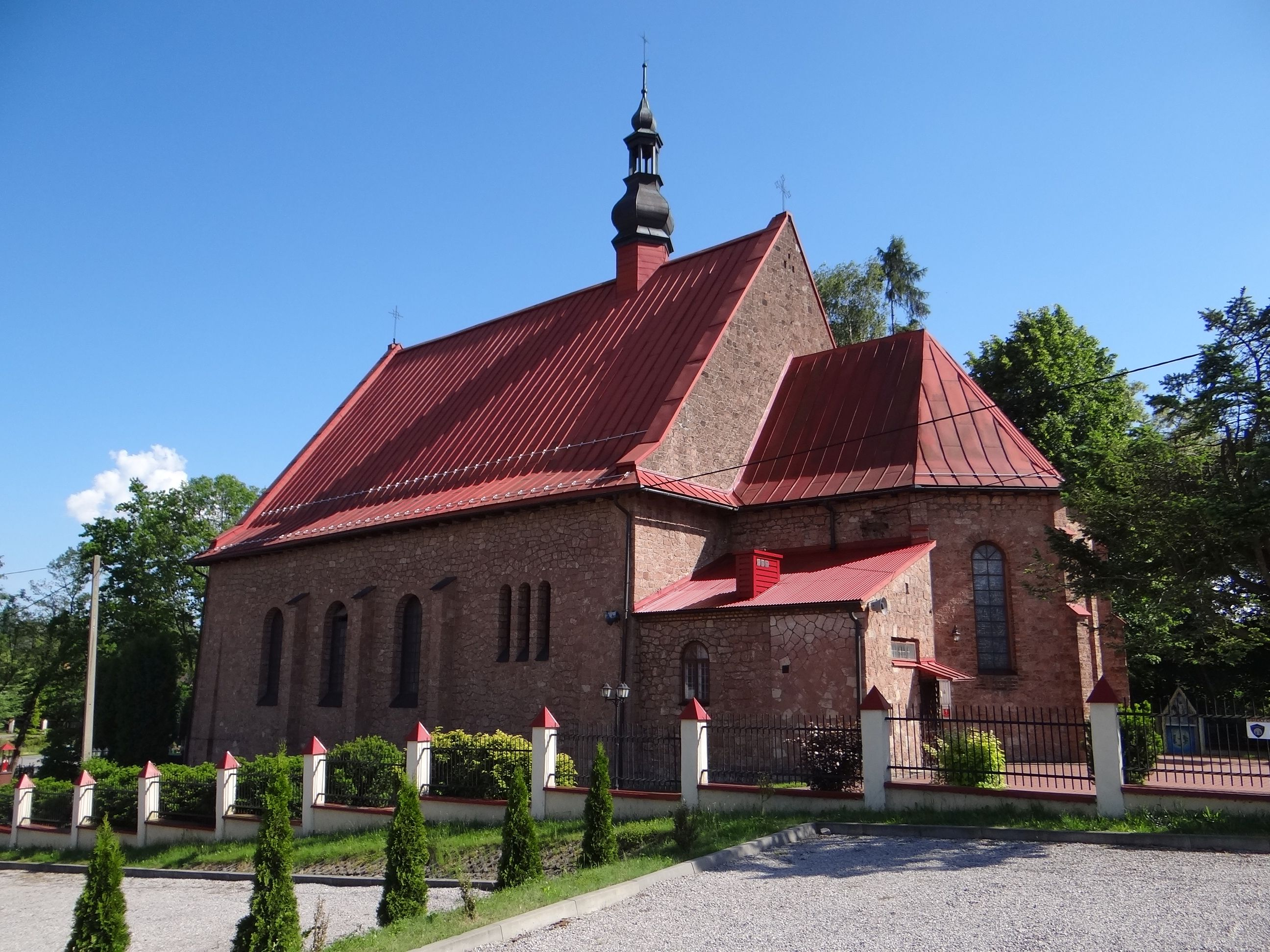
- Church of the Assumption of the Holy Virgin Mary

- Location within Poland
- Coordinates: 50°9′13″N 19°33′59″E
- Country: Poland
- Voivodeship: Lesser Poland
- County: Kraków
- Gmina: Krzeszowice

Population
  - Total: 2,104

Filipowice ([filipɔˈvit͡sɛ]) is a village in the administrative district of Gmina Krzeszowice, within Kraków County, Lesser Poland Voivodeship, in southern Poland.
