= Kraków Valleys Landscape Park =

Protected area in Poland

Coordinates: 50°10′49″N 19°41′50″E

- Park Krajobrazowy Dolinki Krakowskie
- IUCN category V (protected landscape/seascape)
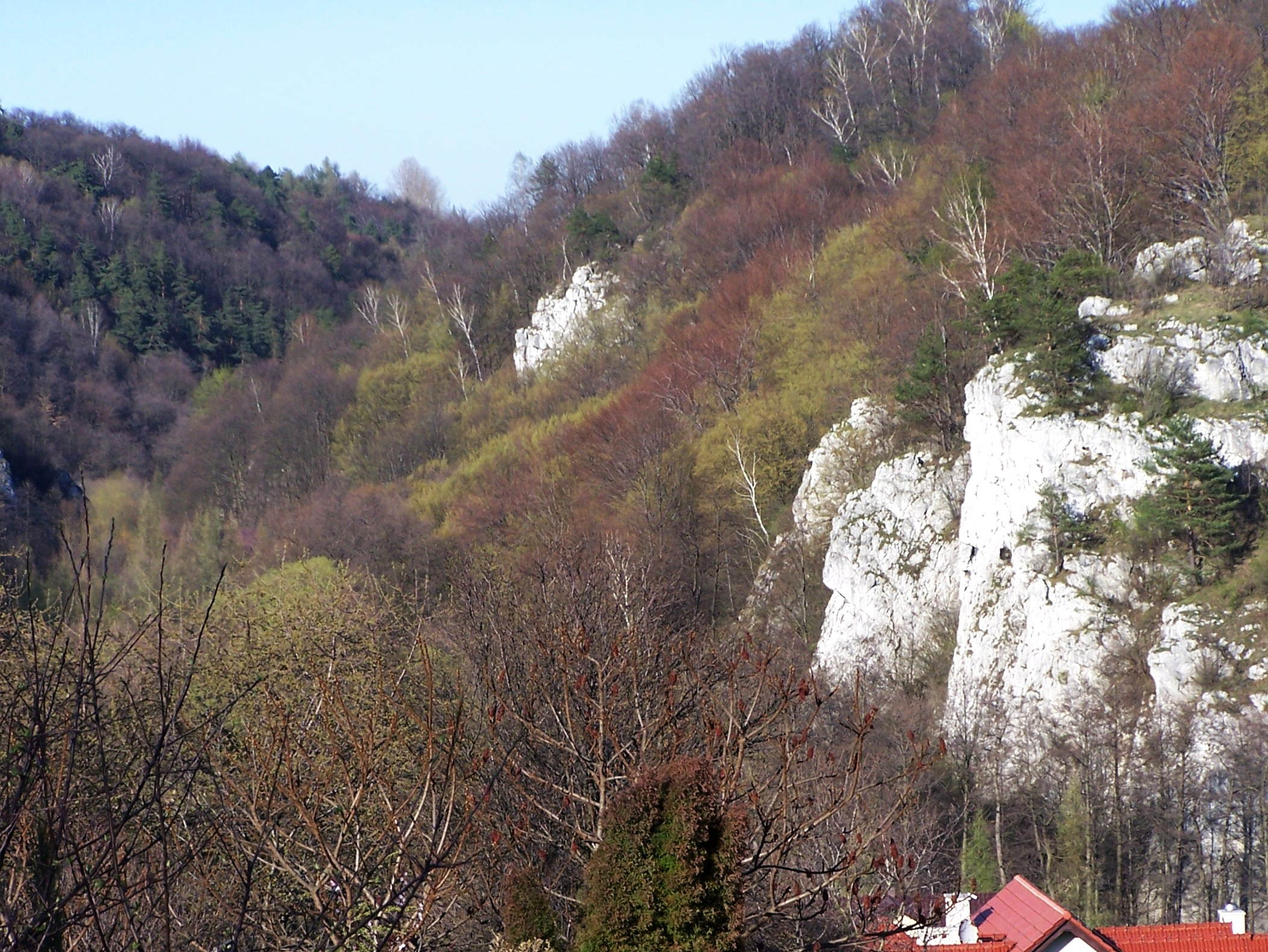
- Interactive map of Kraków Valleys Landscape Park
- Location: Lesser Poland Voivodeship
- Area: 197.77 km^{2} (76.36 sq mi)

Kraków Valleys Landscape Park (Park Krajobrazowy Dolinki Krakowskie) is a protected area (Landscape Park) in southern Poland, covering an area of 197.77 square kilometres (76.36 sq mi). Within the Landscape Park are five nature reserves.

== Location ==
The Park lies within Lesser Poland Voivodeship: in Chrzanów County (Gmina Trzebinia), Kraków County (Gmina Jerzmanowice-Przeginia, Gmina Krzeszowice, Gmina Wielka Wieś, Gmina Zabierzów, Gmina Zielonki) and Olkusz County (Gmina Olkusz).
