= Nowa Góra-Łany =

- Village
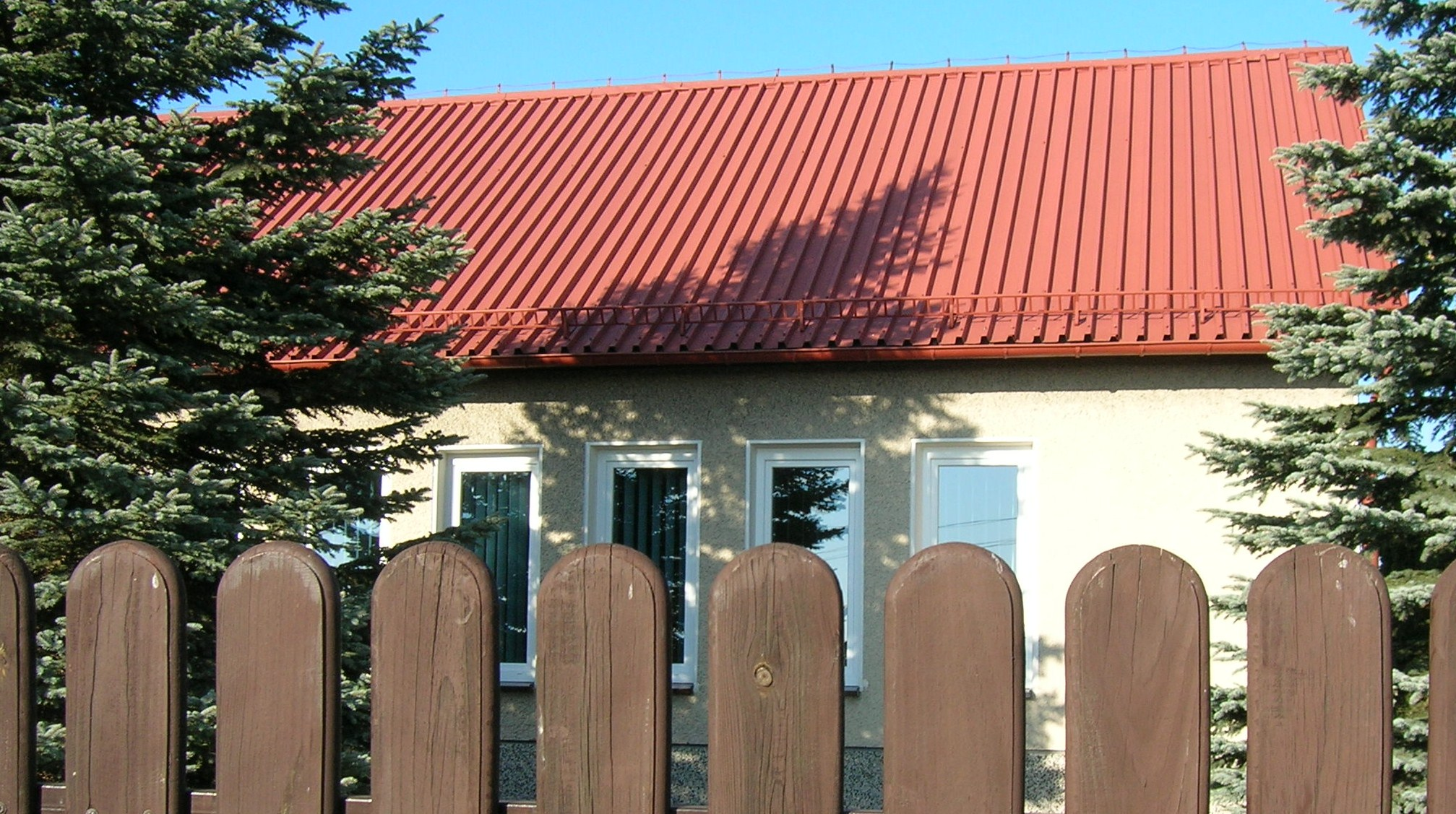
- Church in Nowa Góra-Łany

- Location within Poland
- Coordinates: 50°10′58″N 19°34′30″E
- Country: Poland
- Voivodeship: Lesser Poland
- County: Kraków
- Gmina: Krzeszowice
- Population: 348

Nowa Góra-Łany [ˈnɔva ˈɡura ˈwanɨ] is a village in the administrative district of Gmina Krzeszowice, within Kraków County, Lesser Poland Voivodeship, in southern Poland. Between 1975 and 1988 it was in Kraków Voivodeship.
