= Paczółtowice =

- Village
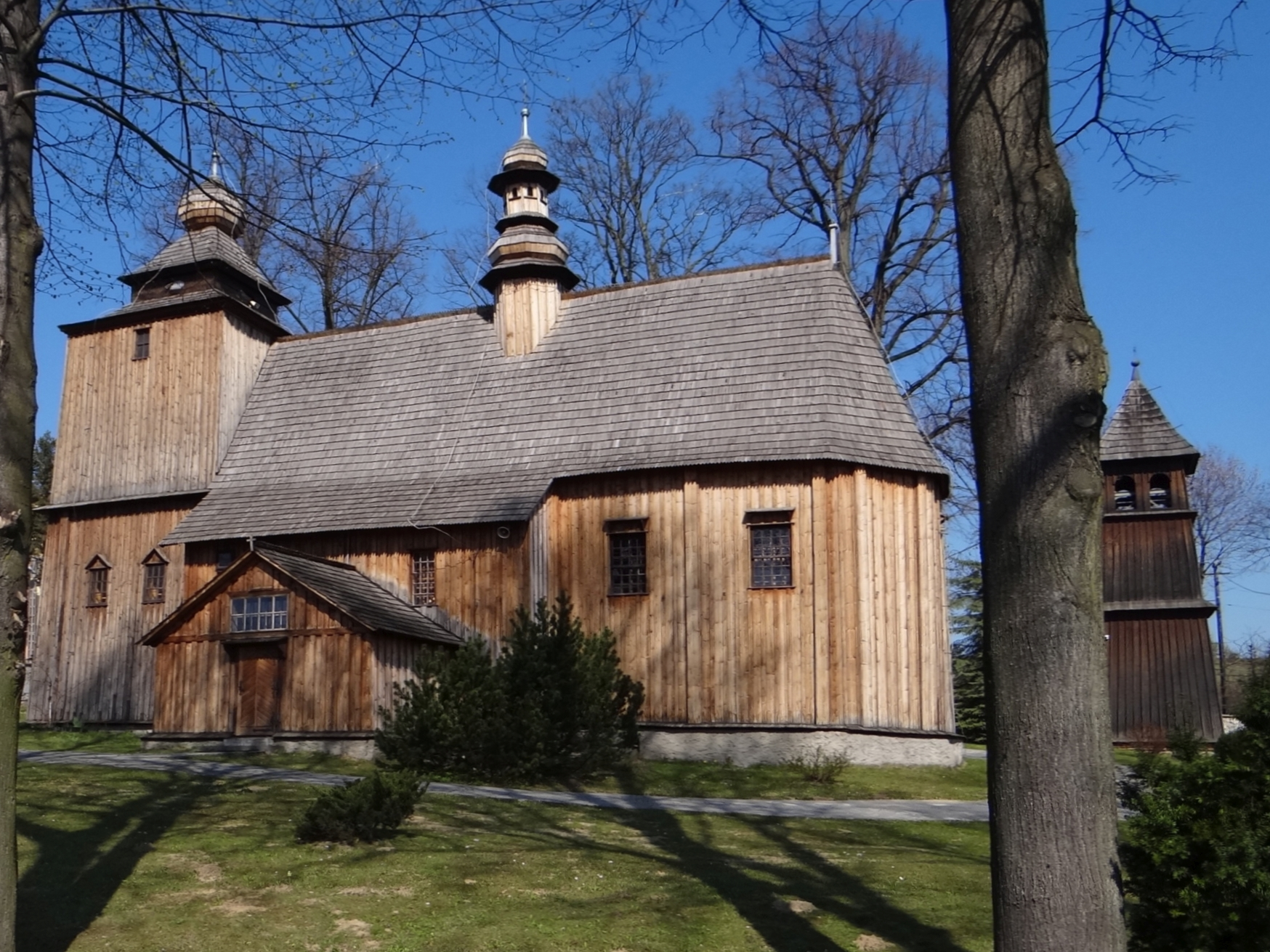
- Church of the Visitation of the Virgin Mary

- Location within Poland
- Coordinates: 50°11′N 19°41′E
- Country: Poland
- Voivodeship: Lesser Poland
- County: Kraków
- Gmina: Krzeszowice
- Elevation: 393 m (1,289 ft)

Population
  - Total: 784

Paczółtowice [pat͡ʂuu̯tɔˈvit͡sɛ] is a village in the administrative district of Gmina Krzeszowice, within Kraków County, Lesser Poland Voivodeship, in southern Poland. The village is located in the historical region Galicia.
