= Karniowice, Chrzanów County =

Karniowice
- Village
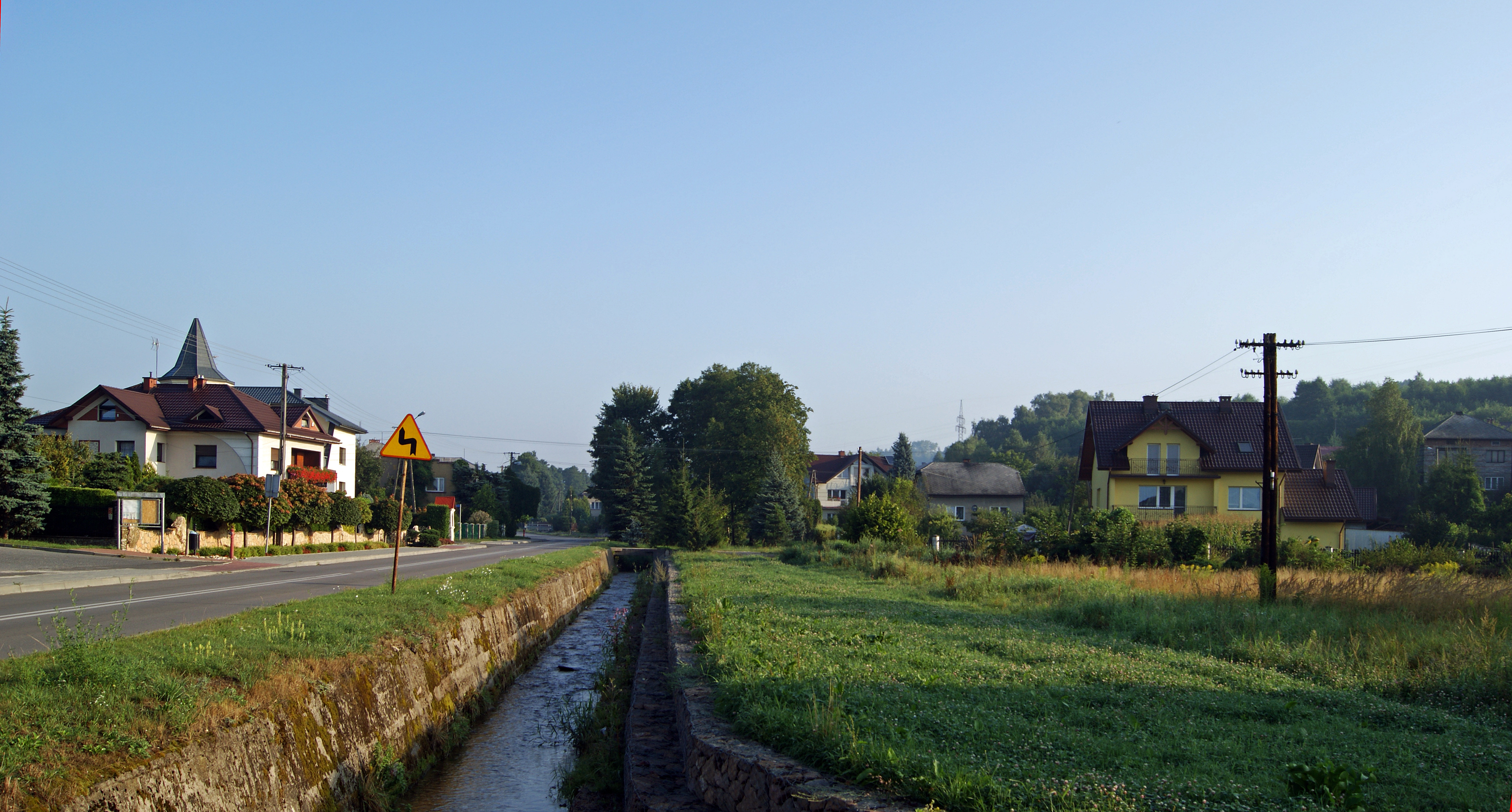

- Location within Poland
- Coordinates: 50°10′N 19°31′E
- Country: Poland
- Voivodeship: Lesser Poland
- County: Chrzanów
- Gmina: Trzebinia

Karniowice [karɲɔˈvit͡sɛ] is a village in the administrative district of Gmina Trzebinia, within Chrzanów County, Lesser Poland Voivodeship, in southern Poland.
