= Dubie, Lesser Poland Voivodeship =

Dubie
- Village
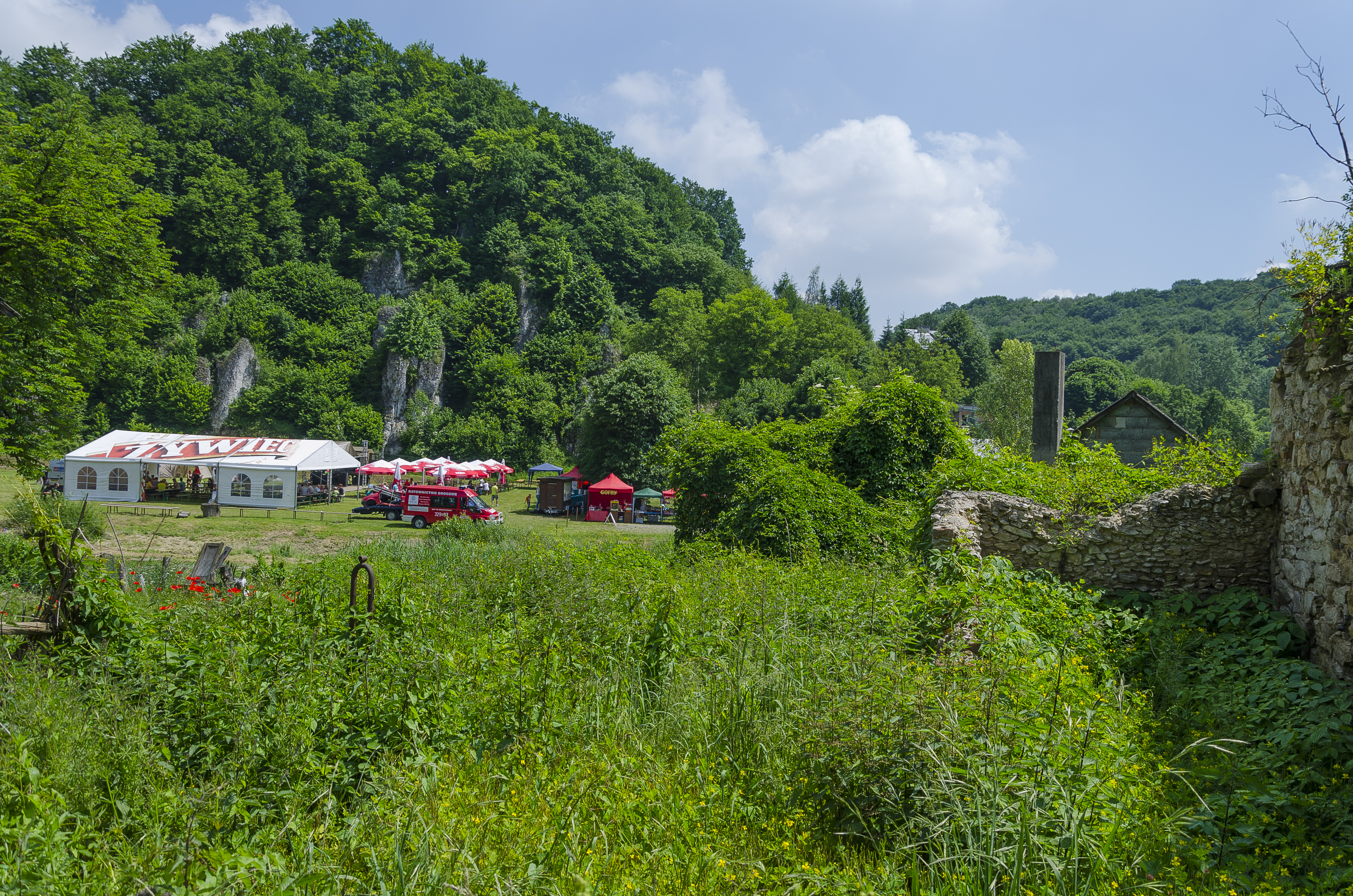

- Location within Poland
- Coordinates: 50°9′1″N 19°41′32″E
- Country: Poland
- Voivodeship: Lesser Poland
- County: Kraków
- Gmina: Krzeszowice
- Population: 202
- Postal Code: 32-064
- Area Code: (+48) 12
- Vehicle registration: KRA

Dubie [ˈdubjɛ] is a village in the administrative district of Gmina Krzeszowice, within Kraków County, Lesser Poland Voivodeship, in southern Poland. The village is located in the historical region Galicia.
