= Nawojowa Góra =

- Village
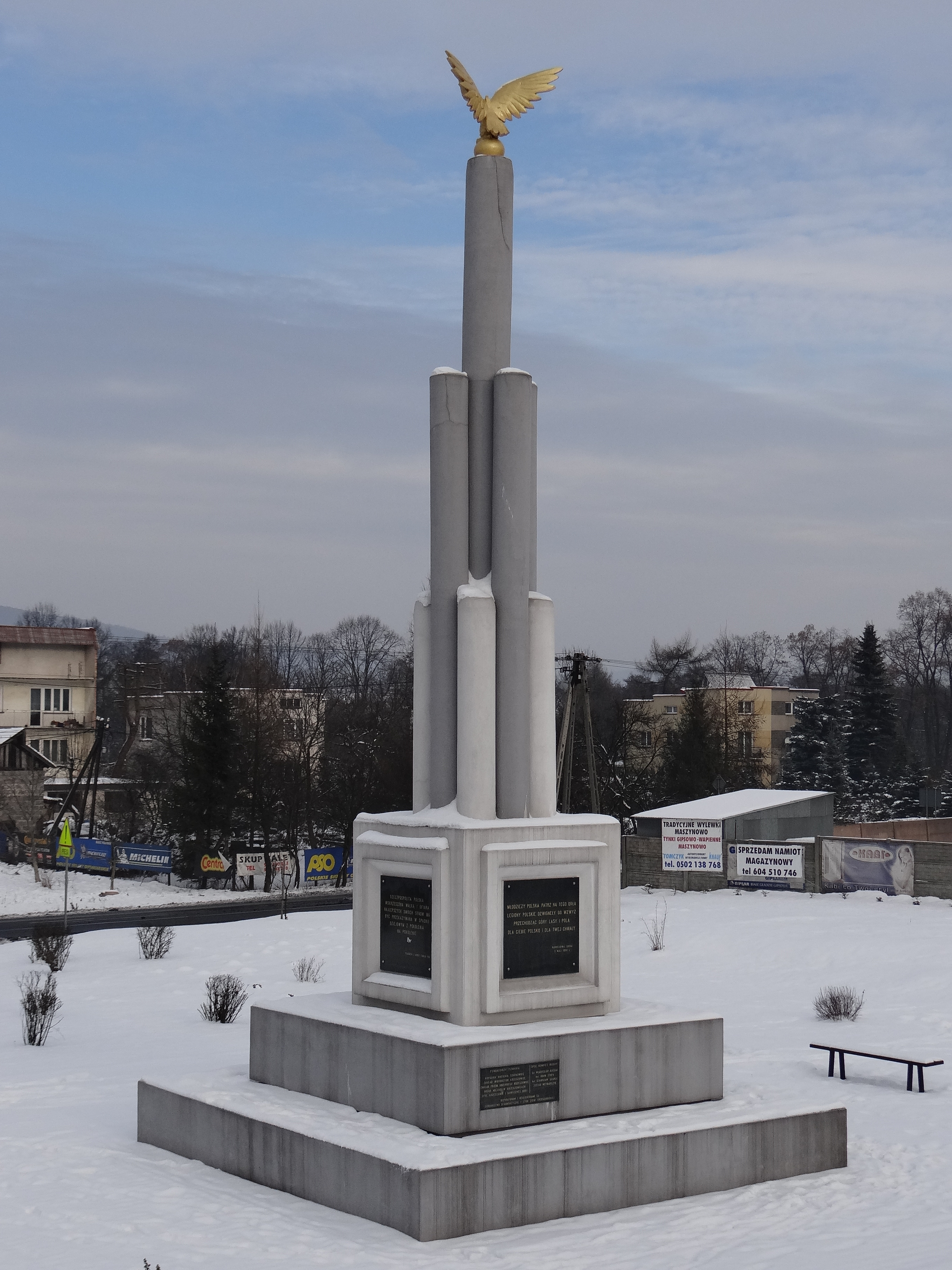
- A monument in Nawojowa Góra

- Location within Poland
- Coordinates: 50°07′08″N 19°40′07″E
- Country: Poland
- Voivodeship: Lesser Poland
- County: Kraków
- Gmina: Krzeszowice
- Population: 1,896

Nawojowa Góra [navɔˈjɔva ˈɡura] is a village in the administrative district of Gmina Krzeszowice, within Kraków County, Lesser Poland Voivodeship, in southern Poland.
