= Płoki, Lesser Poland Voivodeship =

Płoki
- Village
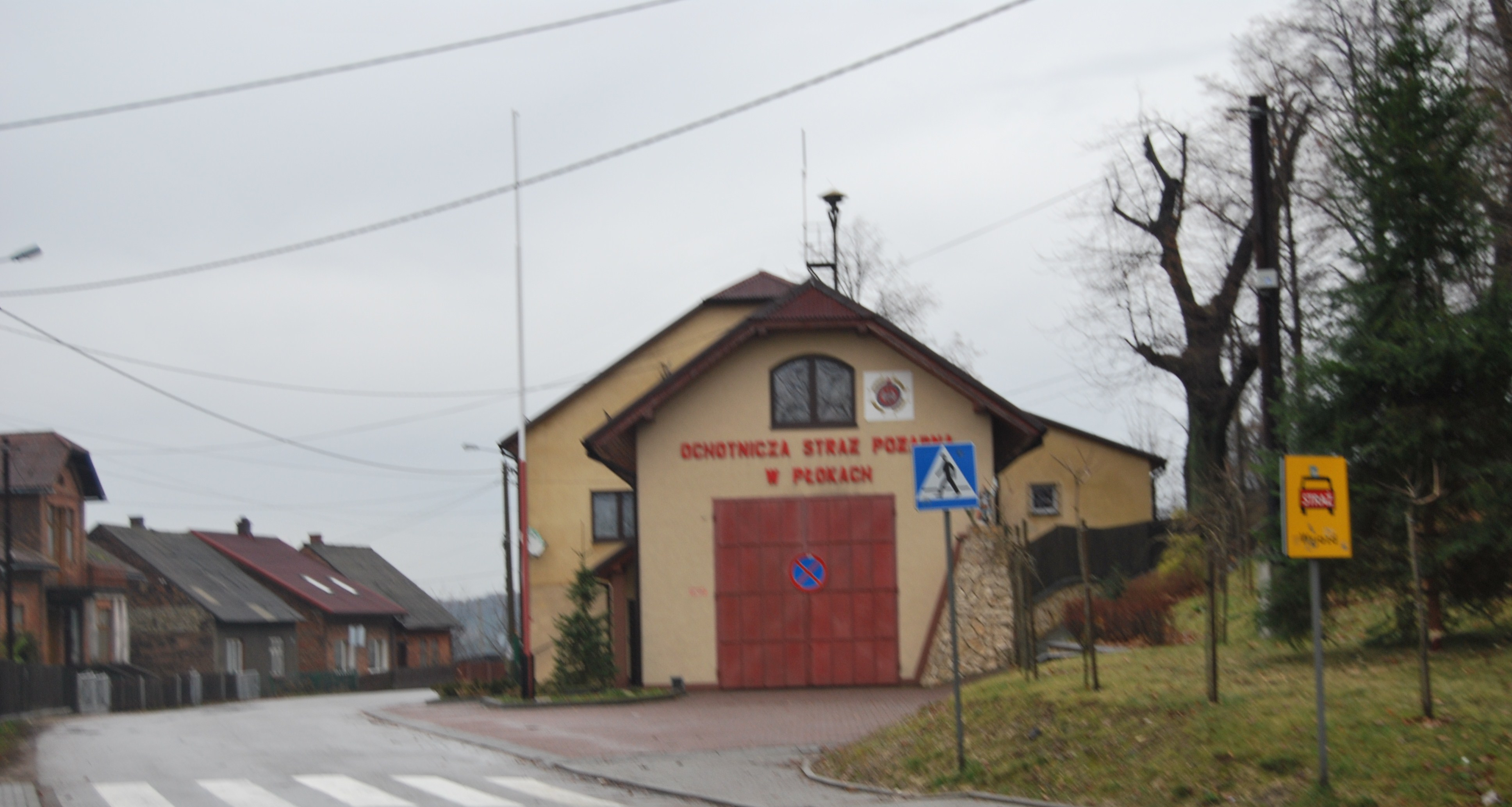

- Location within Poland
- Coordinates: 50°12′N 19°31′E
- Country: Poland
- Voivodeship: Lesser Poland
- County: Chrzanów
- Gmina: Trzebinia
- Population: 962

Płoki [ˈpwɔki] is a village in the administrative district of Gmina Trzebinia, within Chrzanów County, Lesser Poland Voivodeship, in southern Poland. The village is located in the historical region Galicia.
