= Czyżówka, Chrzanów County =

Czyżówka
- Village
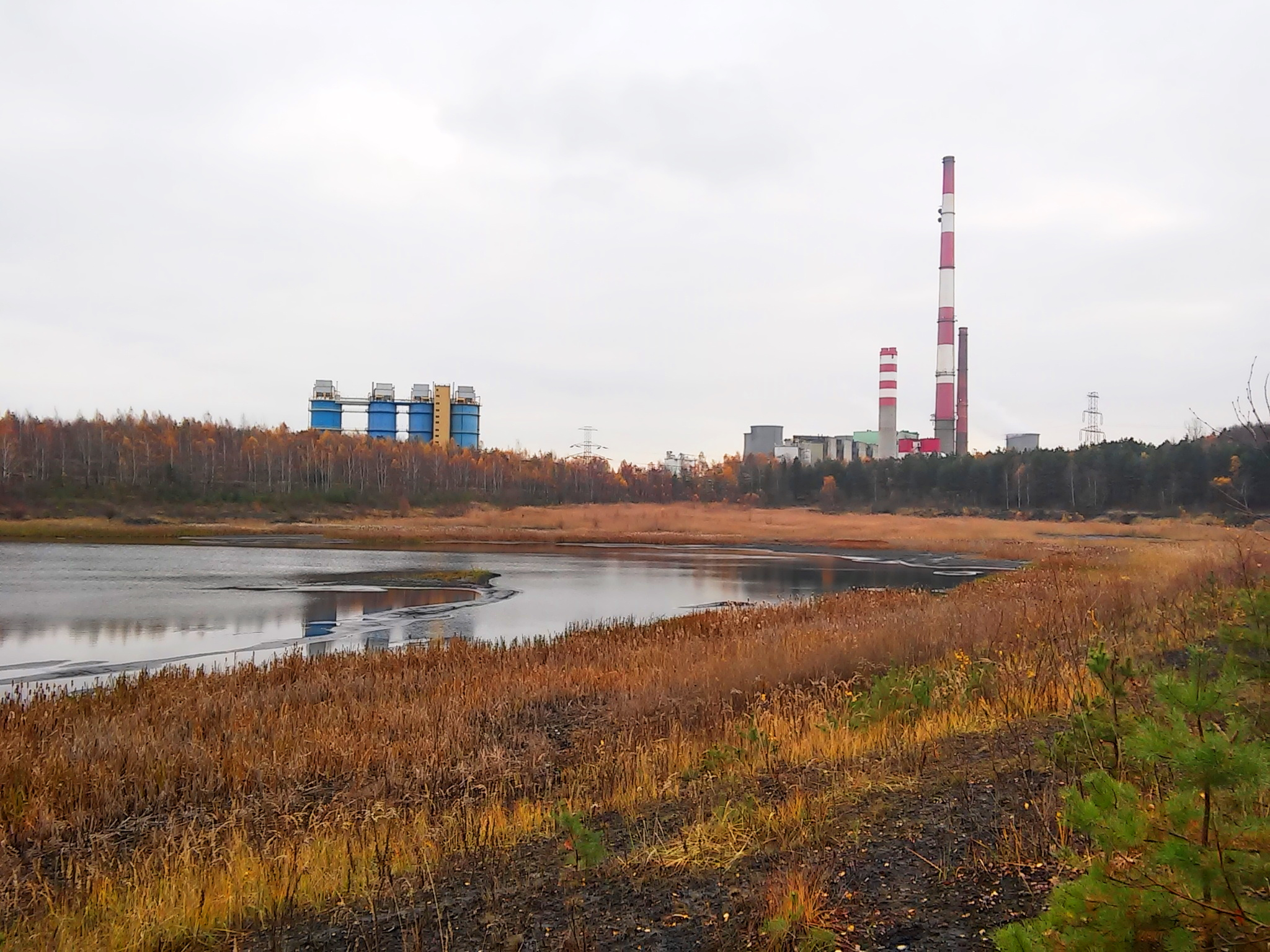
- Pond from a former coal mine near Czyżówka

- Location within Poland
- Coordinates: 50°12′32″N 19°28′23″E
- Country: Poland
- Voivodeship: Lesser Poland
- County: Chrzanów
- Gmina: Trzebinia
- Population: 702

Czyżówka [t͡ʂɨˈʐufka] is a village in the administrative district of Gmina Trzebinia, within Chrzanów County, Lesser Poland Voivodeship, in southern Poland. The village is located in the historical region, Galicia.
