= Żary, Lesser Poland Voivodeship =

Żary
- Village
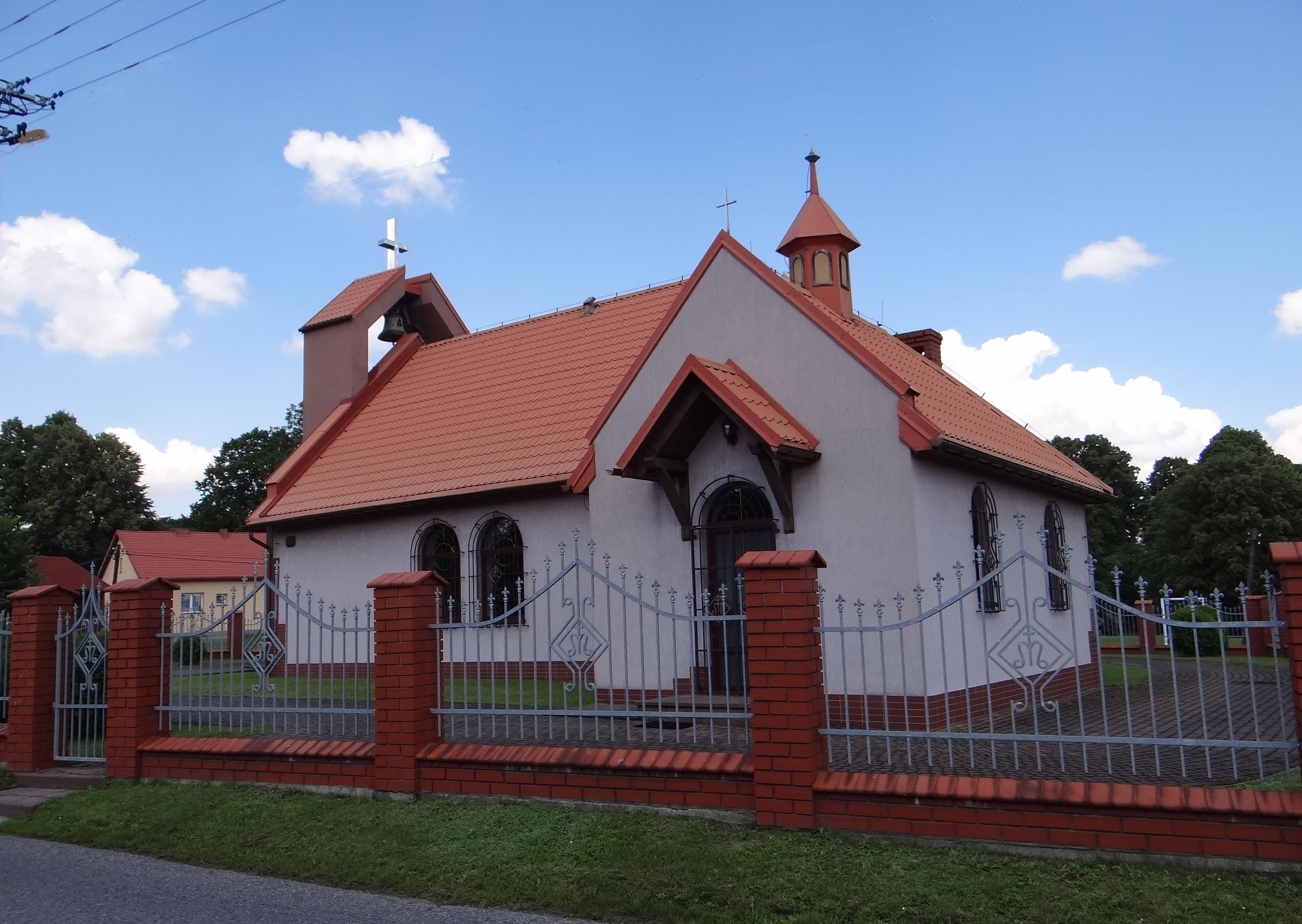
- Chapel

- Location within Poland
- Coordinates: 50°10′21″N 19°41′36″E
- Country: Poland
- Voivodeship: Lesser Poland
- County: Kraków
- Gmina: Krzeszowice
- Population (2003): 123
- Area Code: (+48) 12
- Vehicle registration: KRA

Żary [ˈʐarɨ] is a village in the administrative district of Gmina Krzeszowice, within Kraków County, Lesser Poland Voivodeship, in southern Poland. The village is located in the historical region Galicia.
