= Myślachowice =

- Village
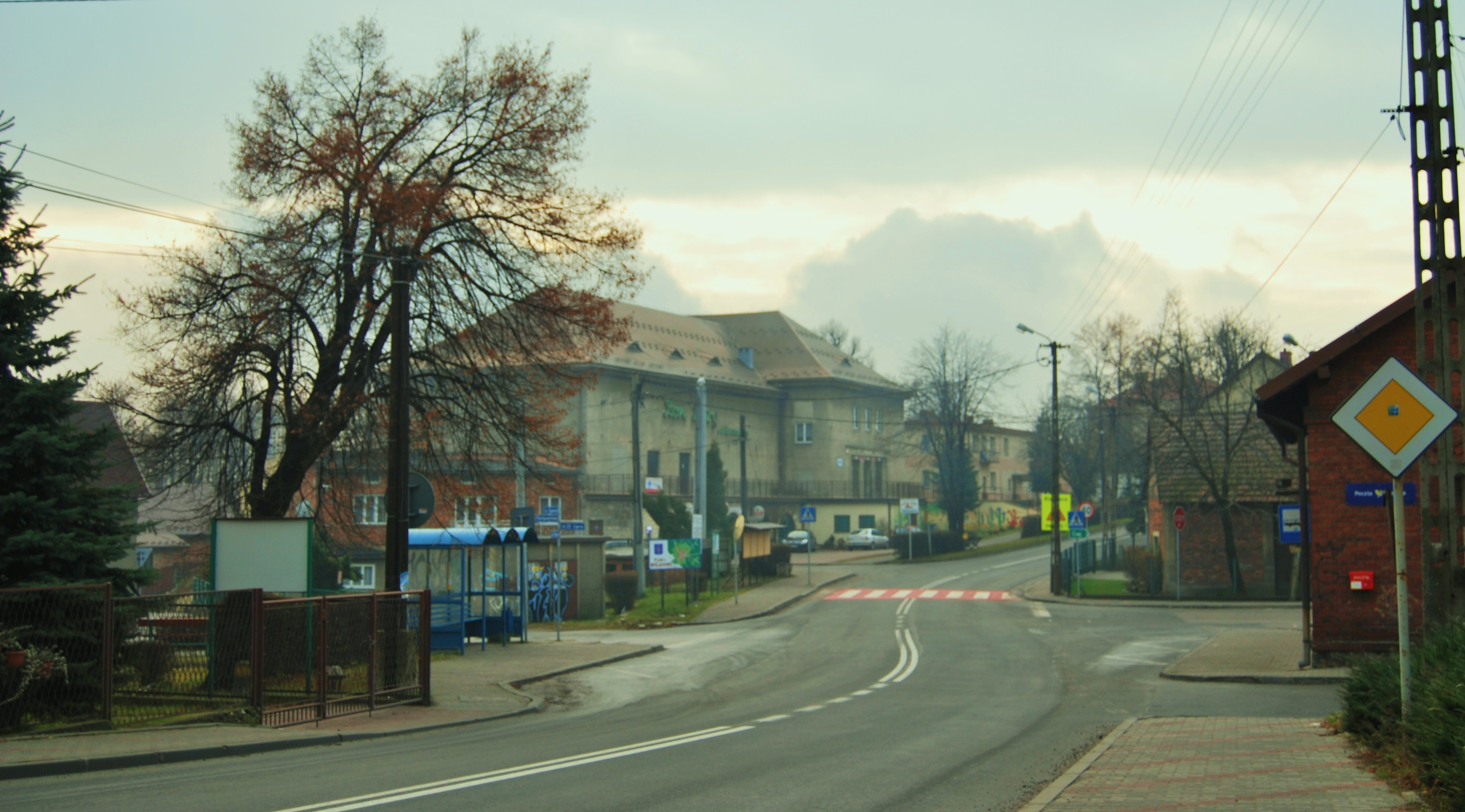

- Location within Poland
- Coordinates: 50°11′3″N 19°28′47″E
- Country: Poland
- Voivodeship: Lesser Poland
- County: Chrzanów
- Gmina: Trzebinia
- Population: 2,081
- Website: http://www.myslachowice.pl/

Myślachowice [mɨɕlaxɔˈvit͡sɛ] is a village in the administrative district of Gmina Trzebinia, within Chrzanów County, Lesser Poland Voivodeship, in southern Poland.
