= Dębnik, Lesser Poland Voivodeship =

Dębnik
- Village
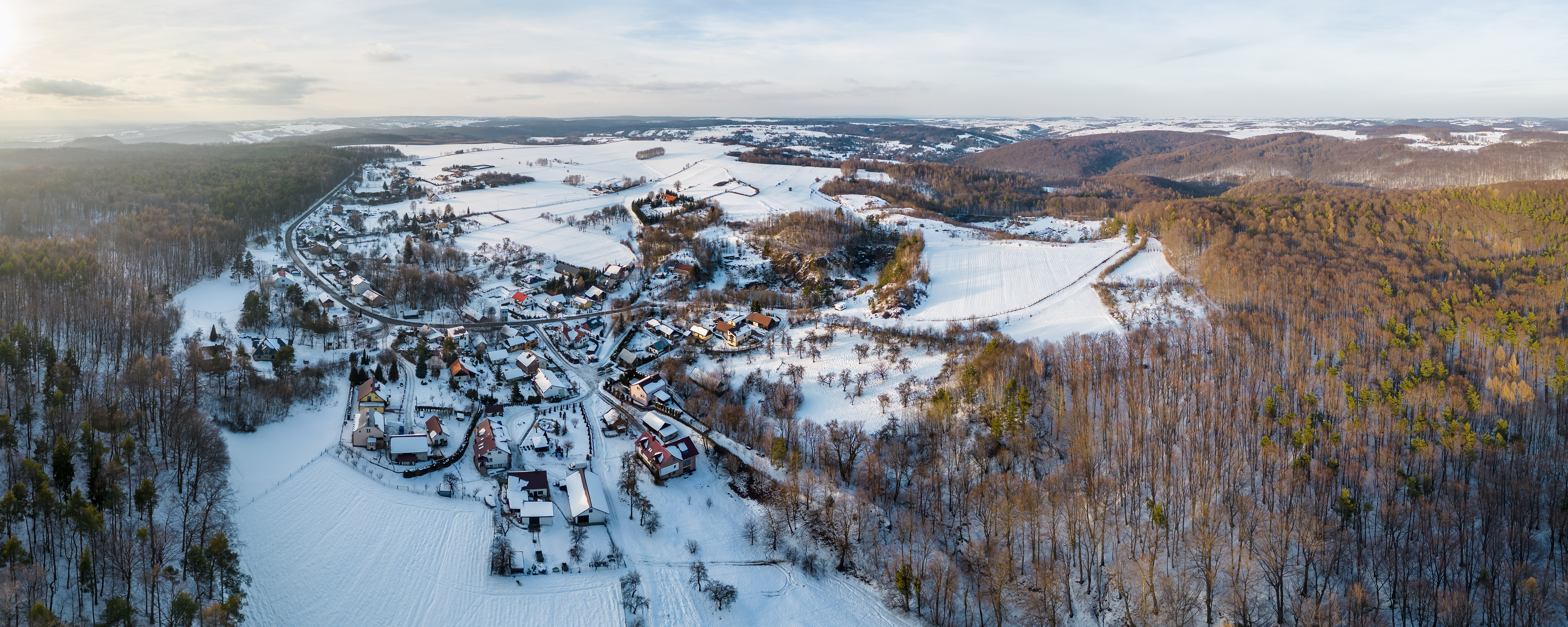

- Location within Poland
- Coordinates: 50°7′37″N 19°41′40″E
- Country: Poland
- Voivodeship: Lesser Poland
- County: Kraków
- Gmina: Krzeszowice
- Population: 114

Dębnik [ˈdɛmbnik] is a village in the administrative district of Gmina Krzeszowice, within Kraków County, Lesser Poland Voivodeship, in southern Poland.
