= Piła Kościelecka =

- Village
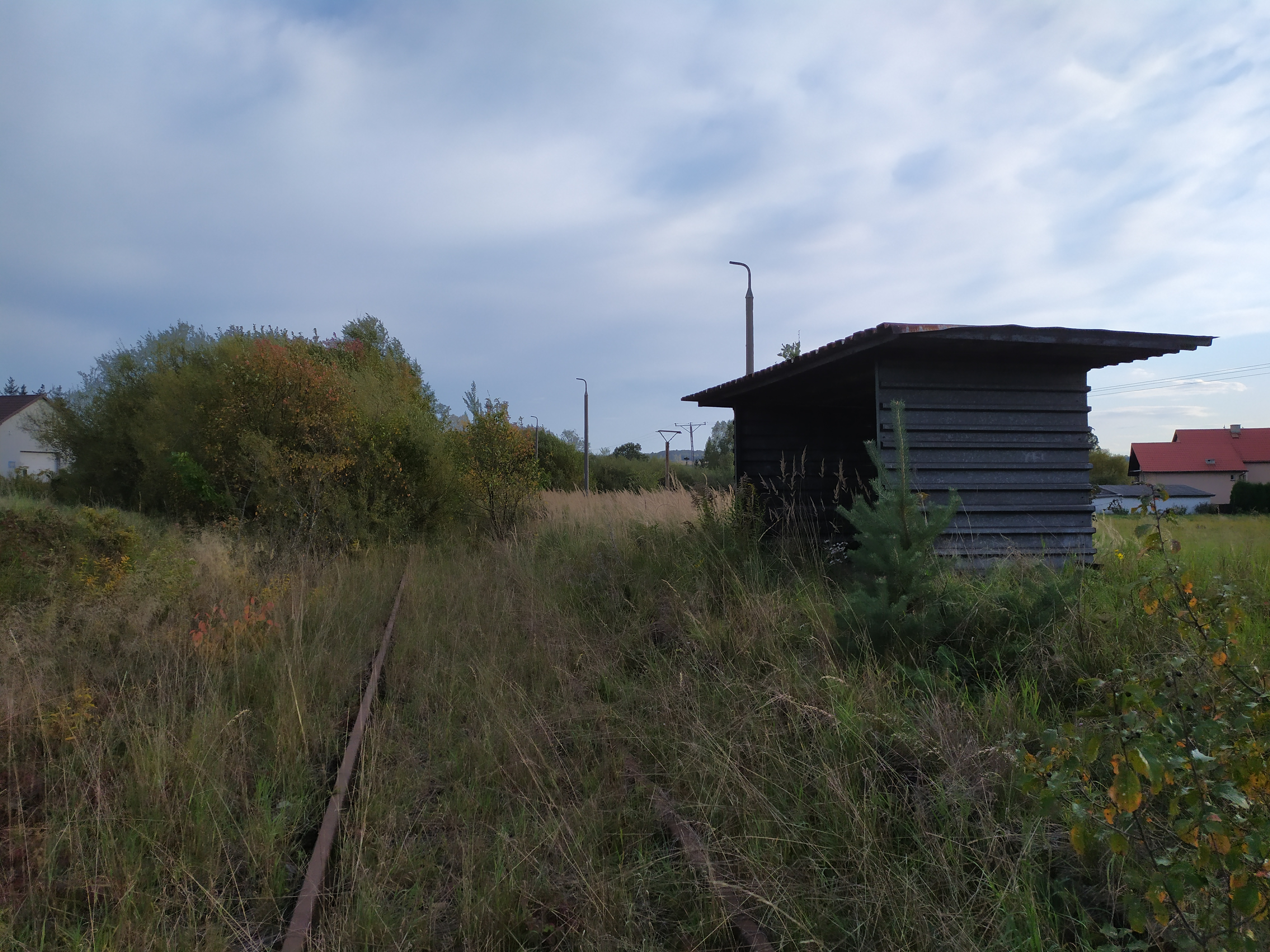
- Train stop

- Location within Poland
- Coordinates: 50°8′N 19°27′E
- Country: Poland
- Voivodeship: Lesser Poland
- County: Chrzanów
- Gmina: Trzebinia
- Population: 572

Piła Kościelecka [ˈpiwa kɔɕt͡ɕɛˈlɛt͡ska] is a village in the administrative district of Gmina Trzebinia, within Chrzanów County, Lesser Poland Voivodeship, in southern Poland.
