= Gmina Krzeszowice =

Gmina Krzeszowice Krzeszowice Commune
- Gmina
- Flag Coat of arms
- Interactive map of Gmina Krzeszowice
- Coordinates (Krzeszowice): 50°8′N 19°38′E
- Country: Poland
- Voivodeship: Lesser Poland
- County: Kraków County
- Seat: Krzeszowice

Area
  - Total: 139.37 km^{2} (53.81 sq mi)

Population (2006)
  - Total: 31,418
  - Density: 225.43/km^{2} (583.86/sq mi)
  - Urban: 9,942
  - Rural: 21,476
- Website: http://www.info.krzeszowice.pl/

Gmina Krzeszowice is an urban-rural gmina (administrative district) in Kraków County, Lesser Poland Voivodeship, in southern Poland. Its seat is the town of Krzeszowice, which lies approximately 24 kilometres (15 mi) west of the regional capital Kraków.

The gmina covers an area of 139.37 square kilometres (53.8 sq mi), and as of 2006 its total population is 31,418 (out of which the population of Krzeszowice amounts to 9,942, and the population of the rural part of the gmina is 21,476).

The gmina contains part of the protected area called Kraków Valleys Landscape Park.

== Villages ==
Apart from the town of Krzeszowice, Gmina Krzeszowice contains the villages and settlements of Czerna, Dębnik, Dubie, Filipowice, Frywałd, Miękinia, Nawojowa Góra, Nowa Góra, Nowa Góra-Łany, Ostrężnica, Paczółtowice, Rudno, Sanka, Siedlec, Tenczynek, Wola Filipowska, Zalas and Żary.

== Neighbouring gminas ==
Gmina Krzeszowice is bordered by the gminas of Alwernia, Czernichów, Jerzmanowice-Przeginia, Liszki, Olkusz, Trzebinia and Zabierzów.
