= Antonina Hoffmann =

Polish actress (1842–1897)

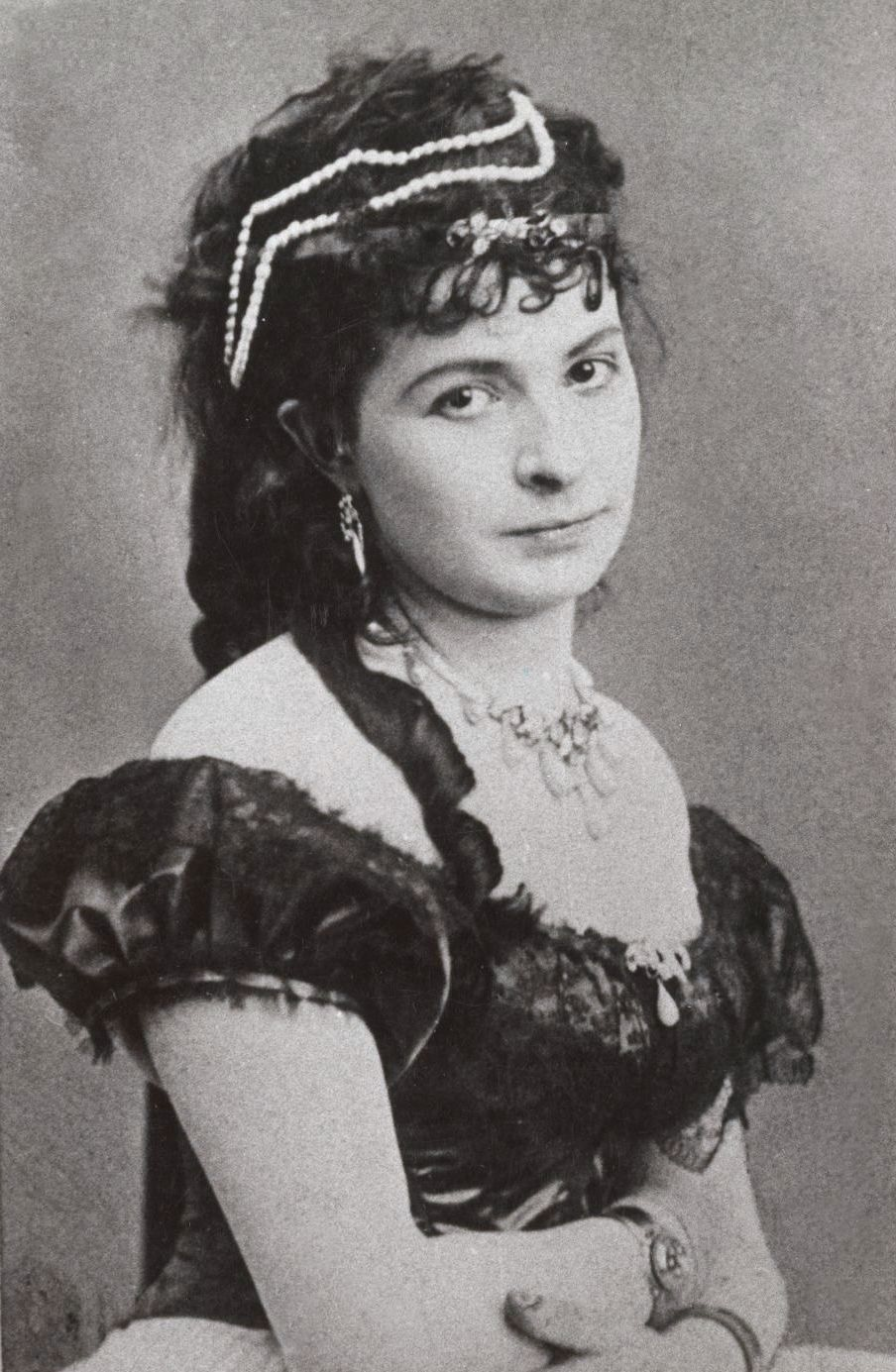
- Portrait of Hoffmann as the Duchess Falconieri in Octave Feuillet's Dalila, 1862
- Born: 16 June 1842; Trzebinia, Free City of Cracow
- Died: 16 June 1897 (aged 55); Kraków, Grand Duchy of Kraków, Austria-Hungary
- Occupation: Thespian
- Years active: 1859-1896
- Movement: Kraków School
- Partner: Stanisław Koźmian
- Children: 2
- Parents: Jan Hoffmann (father); Emilia née Thiel (mother)

Antonina Hoffmann (16 June 1842 – 16 June 1897) was a Polish theatre actress and a leading representative of the so-called 'Kraków School' of acting introduced by Stanisław Koźmian. Her acting career spanned five decades during the Victorian era.

== Early life ==
Hoffmann was born in Trzebinia, Central Europe, the daughter of Jan Hoffmann and Emilia (née Thiel), an impoverished landowning evangelical family of German origin. In her youth she attended Paulina Kraków's finishing school for girls in Warsaw. Against the wishes of her family, she decided that she wanted to go on the stage; in 1858 she began taking private acting lessons from Jan Królikowski, in the same year becoming a student at Józef Rychter's School of Drama in Warsaw. She made her stage debut aged 17, while still a student, as Fredericka Wagner in Émile Augier and Jules Sandeau's comedy Touchstone at the Rozmaitości Theatre in 1859. In 1860 Hoffmann moved to Kraków, where she was hired by Józef Pfeiffer, director of the Municipal Theatre in Kraków. She went on to make many appearances with that company in performances at Lviv, Poznań, Prague, and Warsaw. She was a co-worker and lifelong companion of Stanisław Koźmian (this relationship lasted until her death, although it was not formalized in marriage) and became an exponent of his 'Kraków School' of acting, which involved a deeper analysis of the text of the play. She competed successfully for the position of the leading actress in the group of the Kraków theatre with Helena Modjeska.

== Career ==
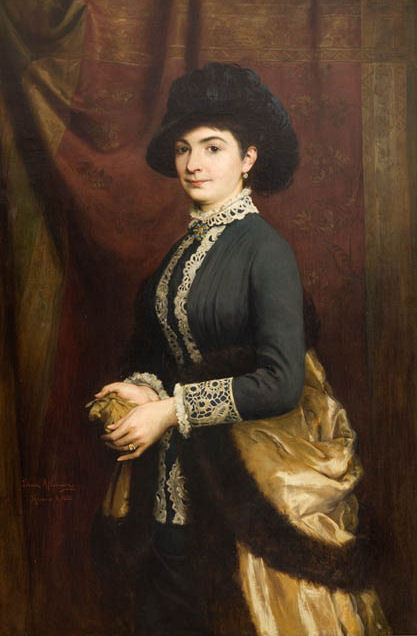
Hoffman by Tadeusz Ajdukiewicz (1883)

Apart from a few short interludes Hoffmann worked exclusively in Kraków until 1893, at first under Pfeiffer's direction and later under that of Adam Miłaszewski (1863–1865), whose period as director ended in fiasco and in the breaking up of the entire company. This resulted in something of a low point in Hoffmann's career. A falling out with Miłaszewski caused her to depart from the Kraków theatre and by 1865 she had joined Konstanty Sulikowski's company in Tarnow. In 1865, Adam Skorupka became head of the Municipal Theatre in Kraków and Koźmian began collaborating with him. Hoffmann returned and was cast in the theatre's productions, performing with the company in Kraków and during guest appearances in Poznań, Krynica, Kielce, Tarnow, and Prague. During this period she travelled to Vienna and Paris to observe theatre there.

== Later years and death ==
During her later years her career diminished while at the same time fighting against the cancer which was to kill her. Hoffmann died in Kraków on her 55th birthday. She was buried at the Rakowicki Cemetery in the family grave of her friend Modjeska and Wendów. In November that year her body was moved to its own grave, which is decorated with a sculpture-bust of the artist by Michał Korpal and an epitaph which states that she devoted 37 years to the Kraków stage.

== Roles ==
In total, she played nearly 400 theatre roles; among these were Elizabeth in Friedrich Schiller's Don Carlos and Lady Milford in the same author's Love and Intrigue, Beatrice in Much Ado About Nothing, Catherine in Taming of the Shrew, Gertrude in Hamlet, Lady Macbeth in Macbeth and Desdemona in Othello. She also appeared in the title role in Jean Racine's tragedy Phèdre, played Suzanne in Pierre Beaumarchais's The Marriage of Figaro and Camilla in Alfred de Musset's No Trifling with Love. She was responsible for introducing the dramas of Juliusz Słowacki to the Kraków stage. She played a number of roles from the Polish repertoire, including Clara in Aleksander Fredro's Śluby panieńskie (Maidens' Vows) and Gulda in Joseph Conrad's Cyganie (The Gypsies). She also appeared in contemporary French dramas, playing, among others, Joanna de Simerose in L'ami des Femmes and Severine in Princess George by Alexandre Dumas, Princess Falconieri in Octave Feuillet's Dalila and the title role in Victorien Sardou's Odette.
