= Młoszowa =

- Village
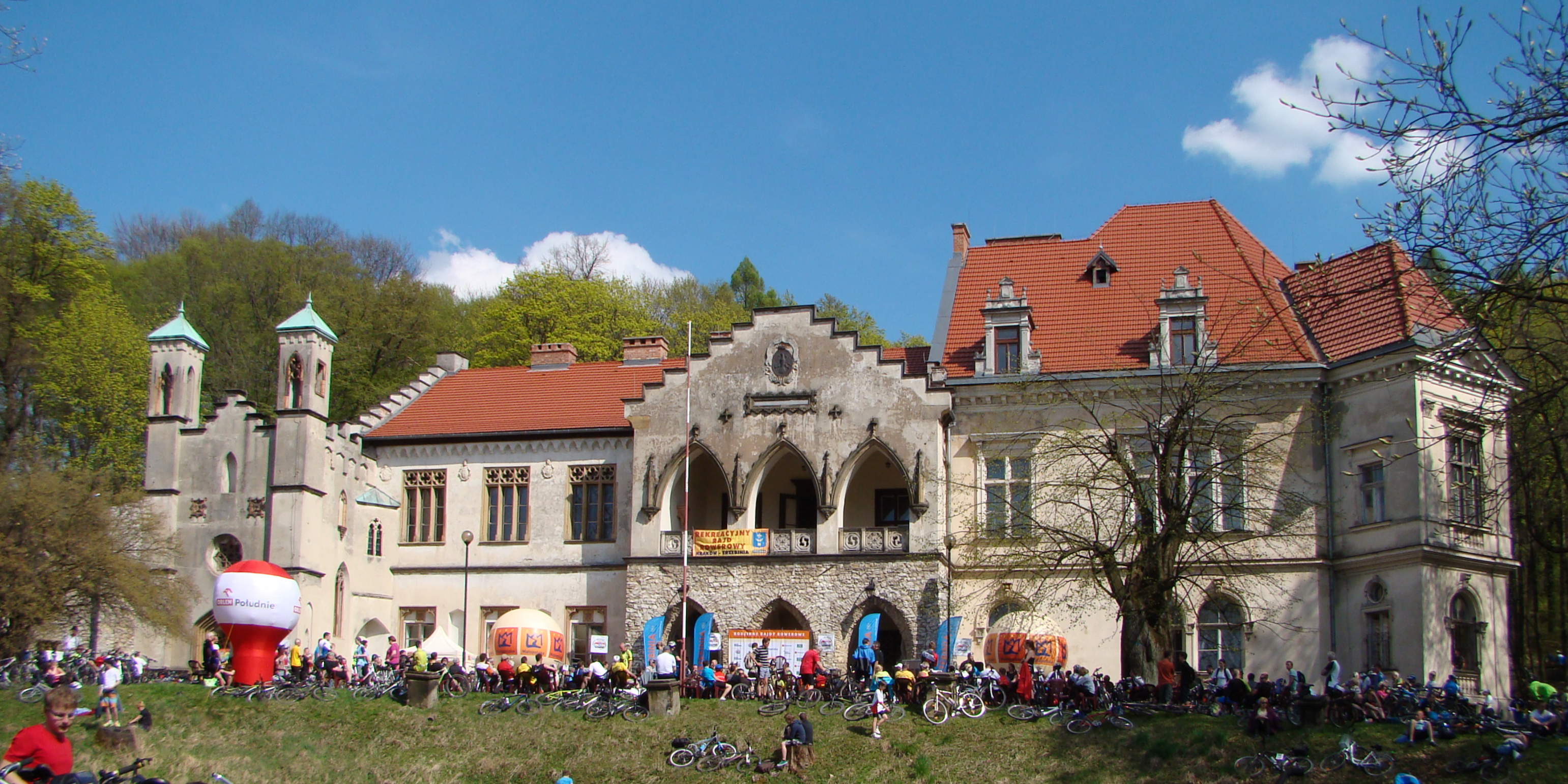
- Palace in Młoszowa

- Location within Poland
- Coordinates: 50°9′N 19°30′E
- Country: Poland
- Voivodeship: Lesser Poland
- County: Chrzanów
- Gmina: Trzebinia
- Population: 2,610

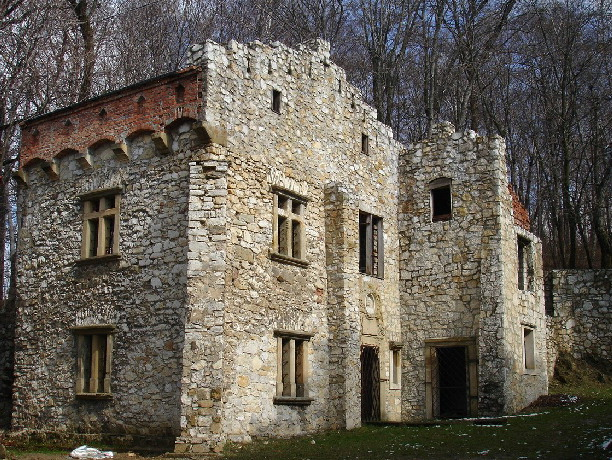
Młoszowa castle tower

Młoszowa [mwɔˈʂɔva] is a village in the administrative district of Gmina Trzebinia, within Chrzanów County, Lesser Poland Voivodeship, in southern Poland.
