= Tenczynek =

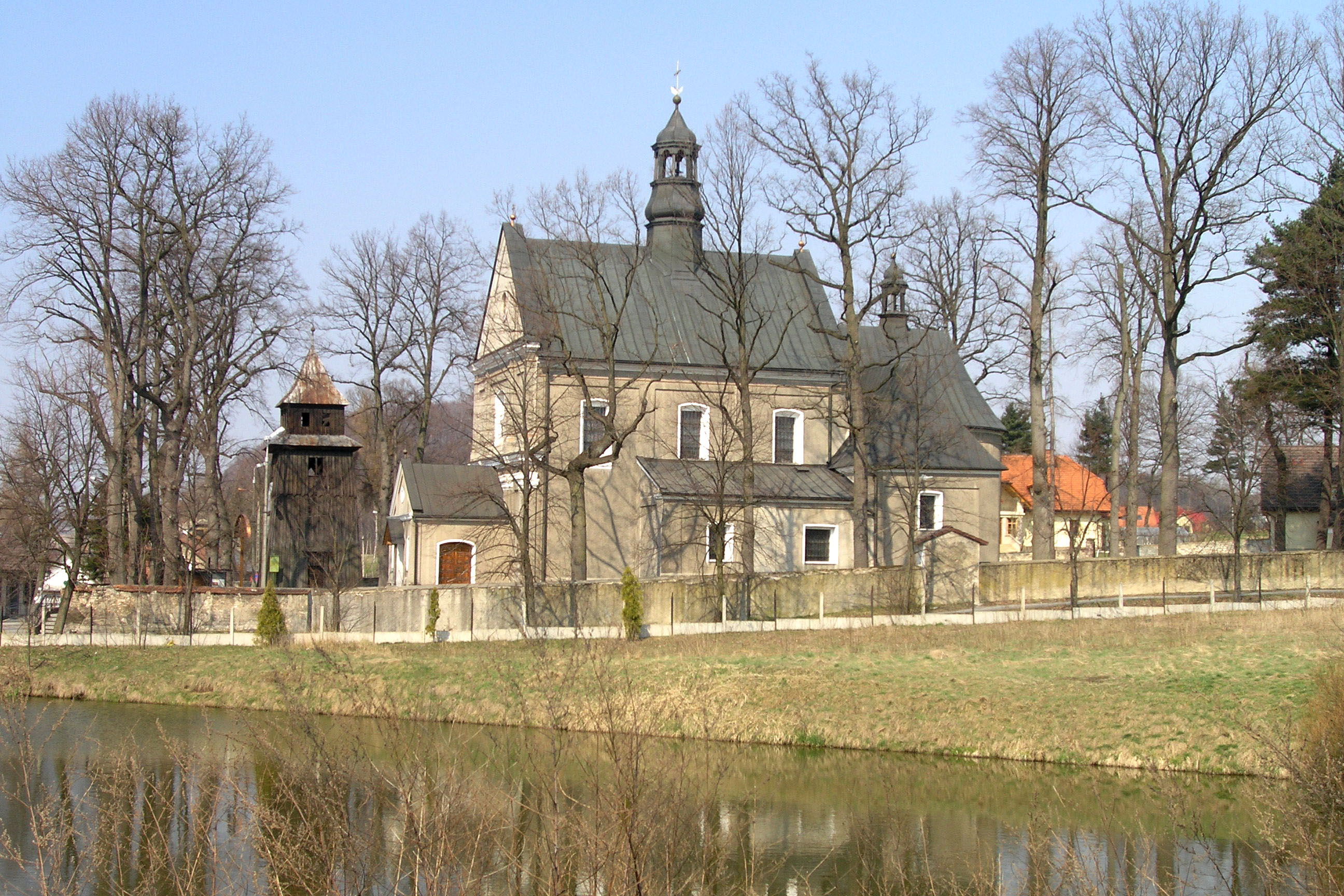
- Saint Catherine of Alexandria church

- Location within Poland
- Coordinates: 50°7′N 19°37′E
- Country: Poland
- Voivodeship: Lesser Poland
- County: Kraków
- Gmina: Krzeszowice

Population (2006)
  - Total: 3,275
- Time zone: UTC+1 (CET)
  - Summer (DST): UTC+2 (CEST)
- Postal code: 32-067
- Area code: +48 12
- Car plates: KRA

Tenczynek (pronounce: [tɛnˈt͡ʂɨnɛk]) is a small village in southern Poland, situated in the Lesser Poland Voivodeship, in Gmina Krzeszowice, about 25 km west of the city of Kraków.

It gives its name to the protected area called Tenczynek Landscape Park.

== Religions ==
- Parish, Roman Catholicism
- Congregation, Jehovah's Witnesses
