= Frywałd =

- Village
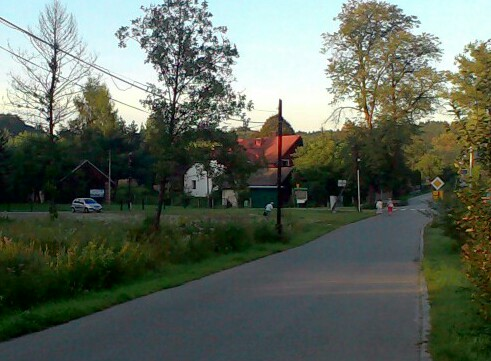

- Location within Poland
- Coordinates: 50°5′N 19°40′E
- Country: Poland
- Voivodeship: Lesser Poland
- County: Kraków
- Gmina: Krzeszowice

Frywałd [ˈfrɨvau̯t] is a village in the administrative district of Gmina Krzeszowice, within Kraków County, Lesser Poland Voivodeship, in southern Poland.
