= Psary, Chrzanów County =

Psary
- Village
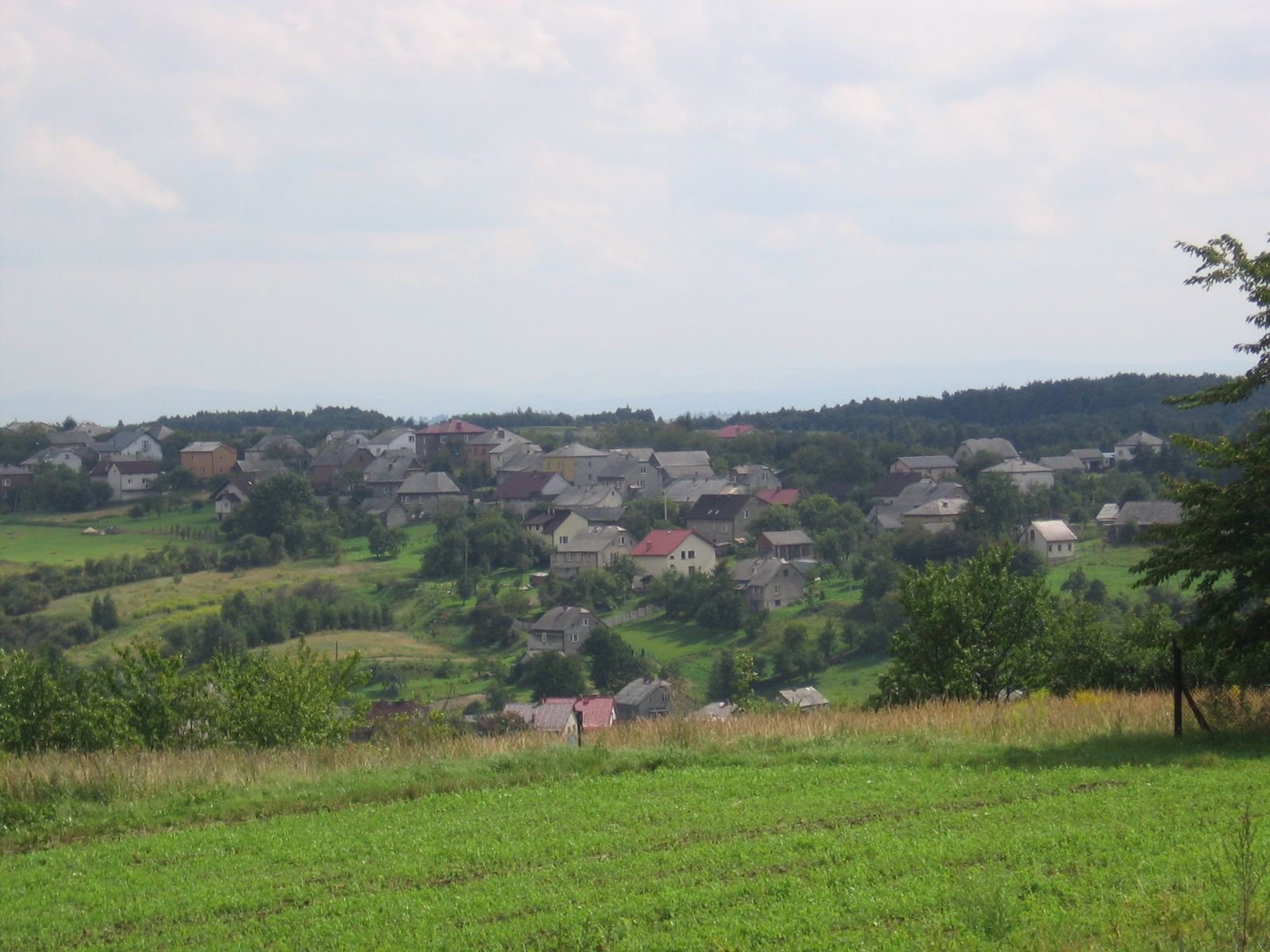

- Location within Poland
- Coordinates: 50°10′24″N 19°31′56″E
- Country: Poland
- Voivodeship: Lesser Poland
- County: Chrzanów
- Gmina: Trzebinia
- Population: 1,439

Psary [ˈpsarɨ] is a village in the administrative district of Gmina Trzebinia, within Chrzanów County, Lesser Poland Voivodeship, in southern Poland.

The village had a population of 1,439 at 2009.
