= Siedlec, Kraków County =

Siedlec
- Village
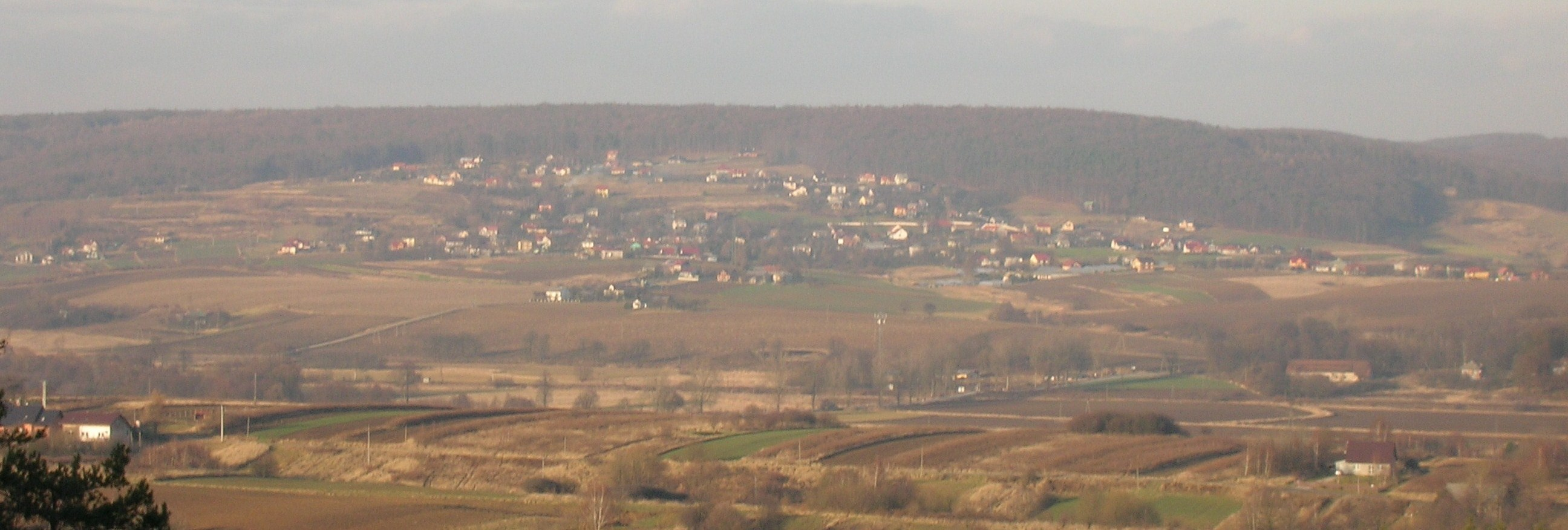

- Location within Poland
- Coordinates: 50°9′N 19°41′E
- Country: Poland
- Voivodeship: Lesser Poland
- County: Kraków
- Gmina: Krzeszowice
- Population: 612

Siedlec [ˈɕɛdlɛt͡s] is a village in the administrative district of Gmina Krzeszowice, within Kraków County, Lesser Poland Voivodeship, in southern Poland. The village is located in the historical region Galicia.
