= Siersza Power Station =

Coal-fired power plant in Poland

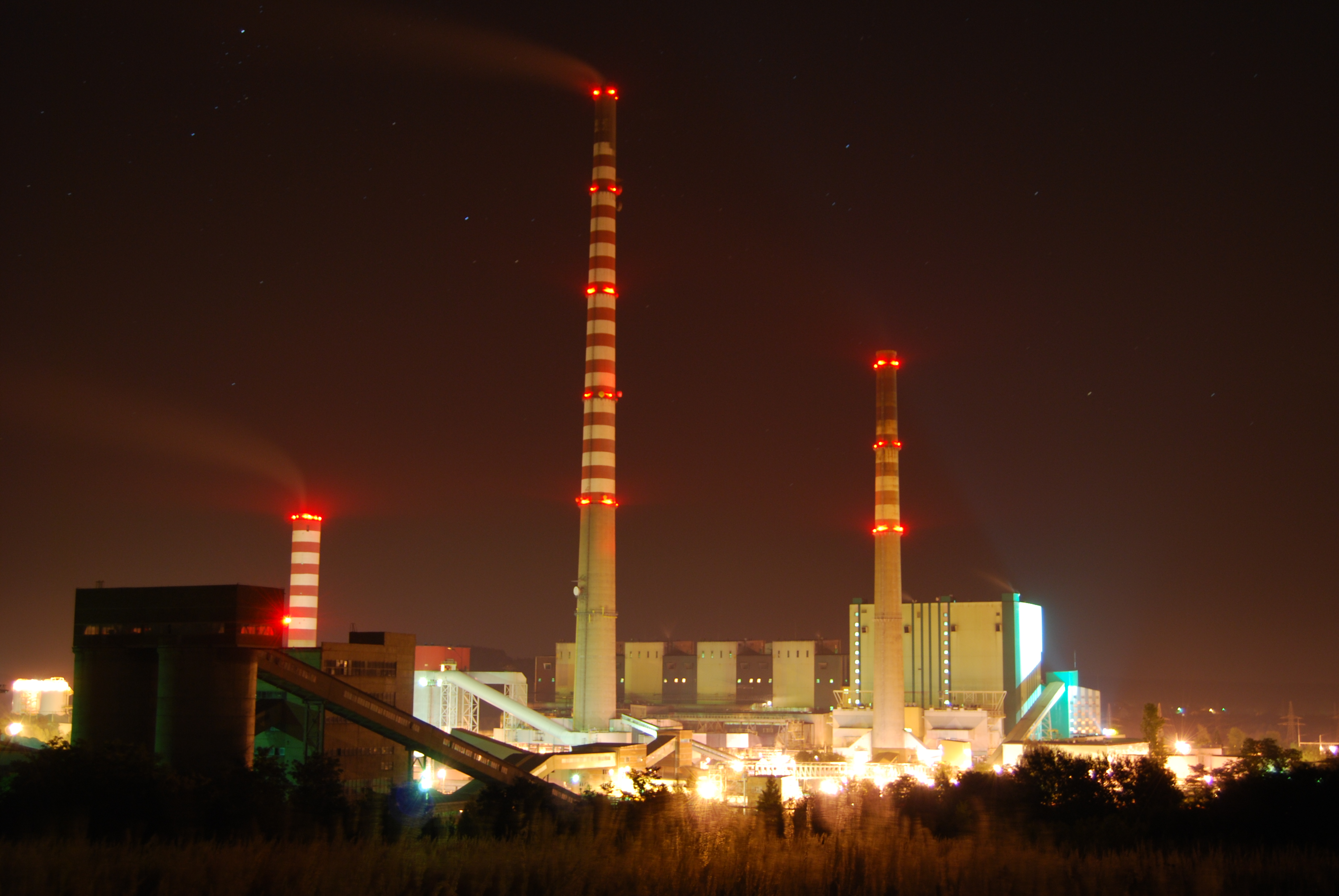
- Official name: Elektrownia Siersza
- Country: Poland
- Location: Trzebinia
- Coordinates: 50°12′22″N 19°27′45″E
- Status: Operational
- Construction began: 1962
- Commission date: 1970
- Owner: Tauron Polska Energia
- Operator: TAURON Wytwarzanie

Thermal power station
- Primary fuel: Hard coal
- Cogeneration?: Yes
- Thermal capacity: 61 MWt

Power generation
- Nameplate capacity: 546 MWe

External links
- Website: www.elsiersza.com.pl
- Commons: Related media on Commons

The Siersza Power Station (Polish: Elektrownia Siersza) is a coal-fired thermal power station in Trzebinia, Poland. It is operated by TAURON Wytwarzanie. There are 6 turbo generators (two are no longer used) and 3 chimneys. The installed capacity is 546 MWe and the thermal capacity is 61 MWt. The remaining thermal energy is used locally.
