= Sankharavam =

Sankharavam may refer to these Indian films:

- Sankharavam (1987 film), a Telugu action film
- Sankharavam (2004 film), a Telugu film

== See also ==
- Sanka (disambiguation)
- Shankha, conch in Indian religions
