= Miękinia, Lesser Poland Voivodeship =

Miękinia
- Village
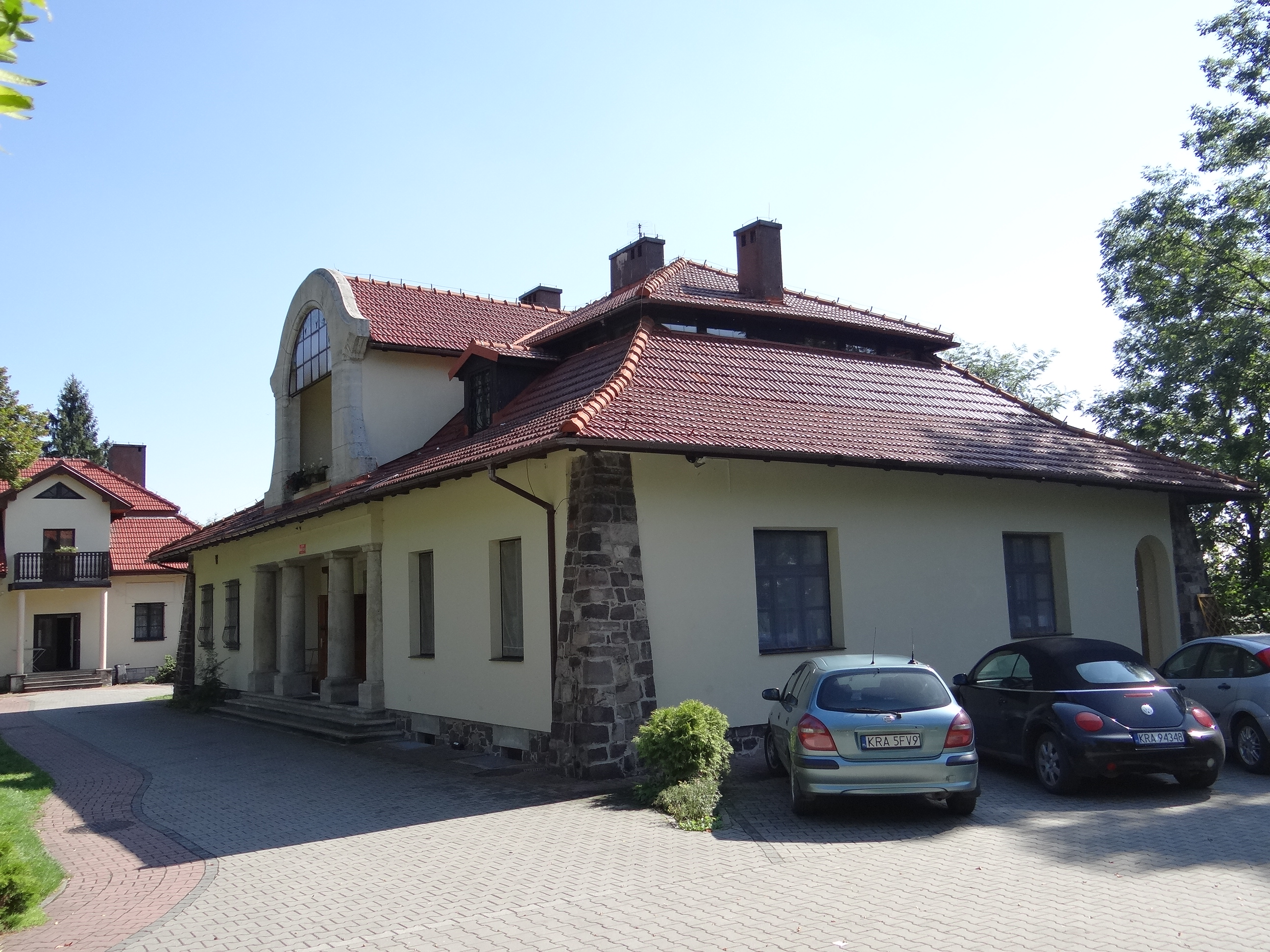
- Local mine's office (villa)

- Location within Poland
- Coordinates: 50°10′N 19°36′E
- Country: Poland
- Voivodeship: Lesser Poland
- County: Kraków
- Gmina: Krzeszowice
- Population: 1,233
- Website: http://www.miekinia.eu

Miękinia [mjɛŋˈkiɲa] is a village in the administrative district of Gmina Krzeszowice, within Kraków County, Lesser Poland Voivodeship, in southern Poland.
