= Dulowa =

- Village
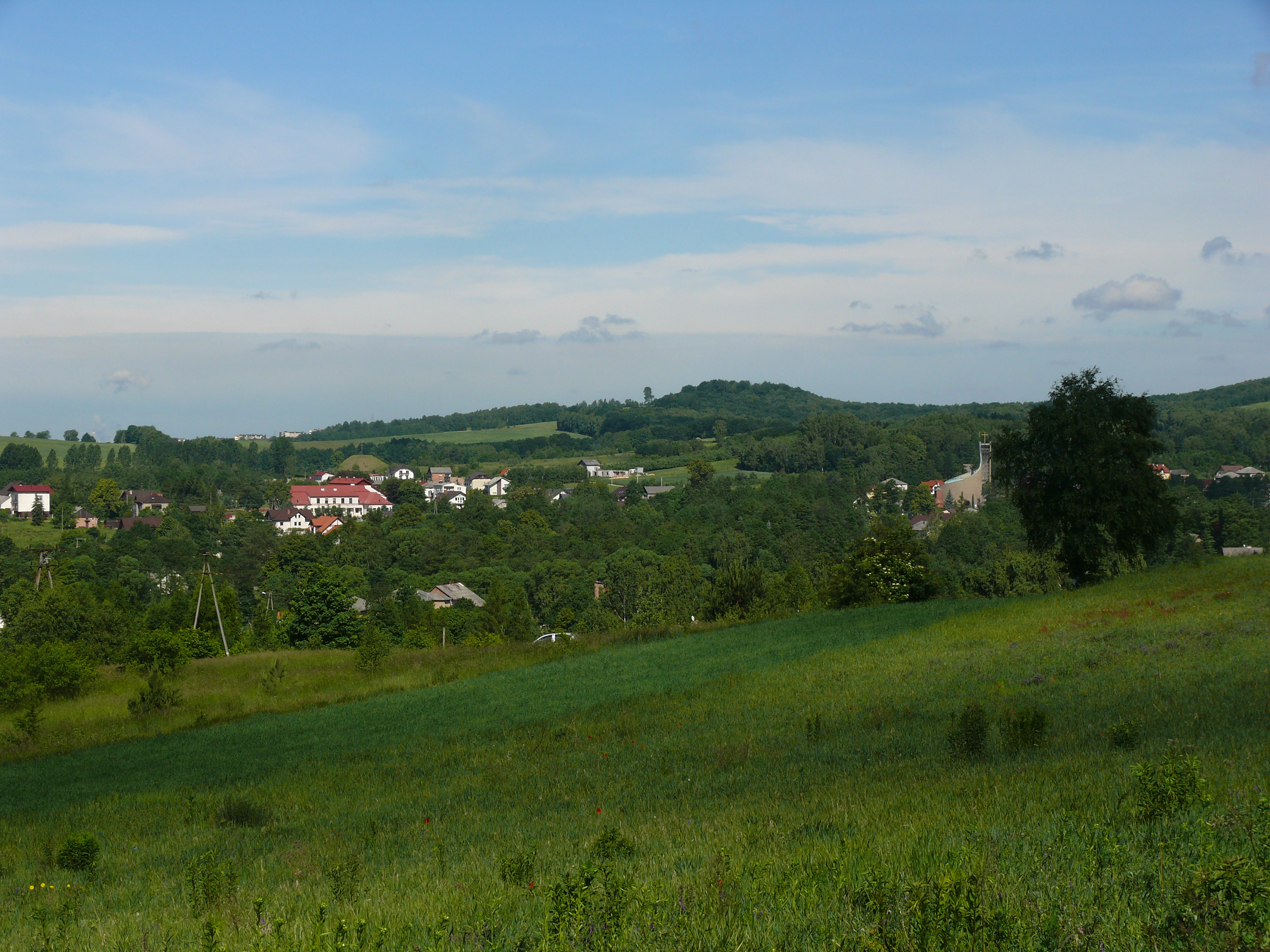

- Location within Poland
- Coordinates: 50°9′N 19°31′E
- Country: Poland
- Voivodeship: Lesser Poland
- County: Chrzanów
- Gmina: Trzebinia
- Elevation: 300 m (980 ft)
- Population: 1,384

Dulowa [duˈlɔva] is a village in the administrative district of Gmina Trzebinia, within Chrzanów County, Lesser Poland Voivodeship, in southern Poland.
