= Trzebinia =

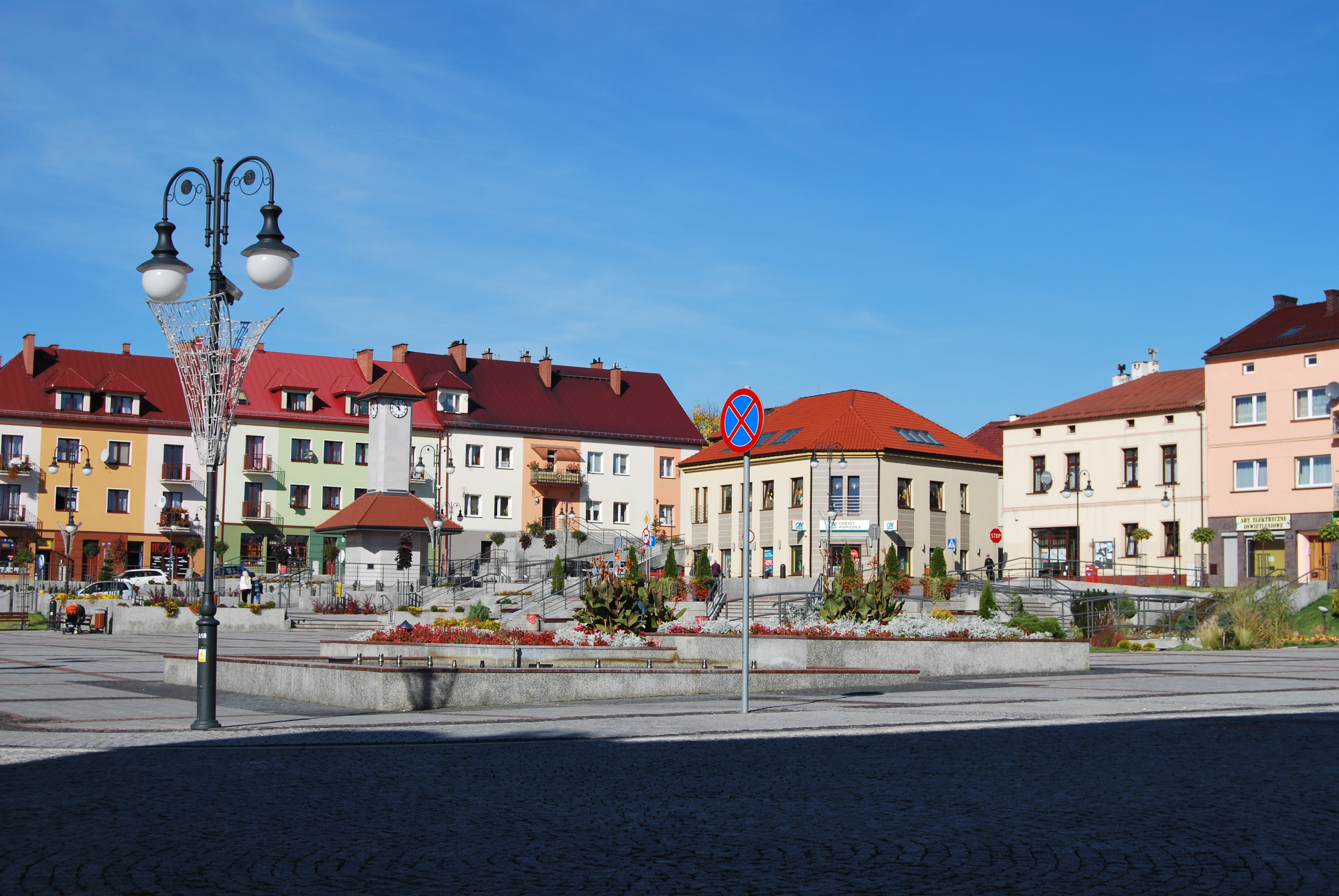
- Market square in 2012

- Flag Coat of arms

- Location within Poland
- Coordinates: 50°10′N 19°29′E
- Country: Poland
- Voivodeship: Lesser Poland
- County: Chrzanów
- Gmina: Trzebinia

Government
  - Mayor: Jaroslaw Okoczuk

Area
  - Total: 31.3 km^{2} (12.1 sq mi)

Population (2006)
  - Total: 18,769
  - Density: 600/km^{2} (1,550/sq mi)
- Time zone: UTC+1 (CET)
  - Summer (DST): UTC+2 (CEST)
- Postal code: 32-540
- Car plates: KCH
- Website: Town guidebook

Trzebinia ([tʂɛˈbʲiɲa]; Yiddish: טשעבין Tchebin) is a town in Chrzanów County, Lesser Poland, Poland with an Orlen oil refinery and a major rail junction of the Kraków - Katowice line, with connections to Oświęcim and Spytkowice. The town became part of Lesser Poland Voivodeship after being part of Katowice Voivodeship (1975–1998). With population of 20,175 (Dec. 31, 2010), Trzebinia is an important industrial center. The town lies in the Kraków-Częstochowa Upland, 269 to 407 m (883 to 1,335 ft) above sea level. Trzebinia is a rail and road hub, and lies at a junction of the A4 Motorway and National Road Nr. 79. The distance to John Paul II International Airport Kraków-Balice is 30 kilometres (19 miles).

== History ==
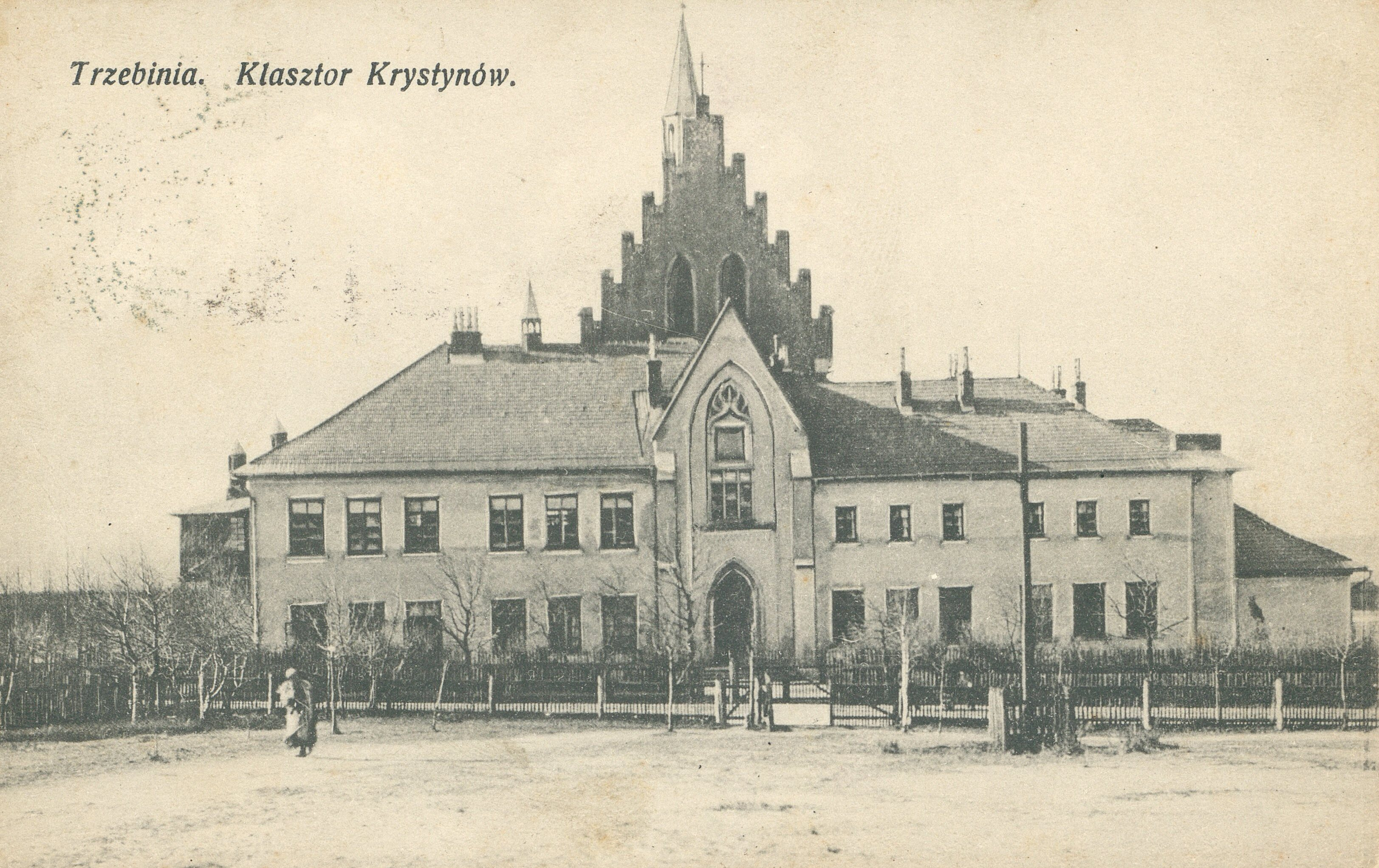
Old monastery in the early 20th century

History of Trzebinia dates back to the late Middle Ages. In 1325, the settlement already had a church, which was mentioned in 1470 by Jan Długosz. Until the early 15th century, Trzebinia was a royal village, then it passed into the hands of local noble families. At that time, zinc and lead deposits were discovered here. Trzebinia, however, still remained a village, or rather a mining settlement, which from 1569 until 1802 belonged to the Schilhra Trzebiński family, Abdank coat of arms. Administratively Trzebinia was located in the Kraków Voivodeship in the Lesser Poland Province of the Polish Crown. In 1772, in the First Partition of Poland, it was annexed by the Austria and made part of Galicia. It was regained by Poles in the Austro-Polish War of 1809 and included within the short-lived Polish Duchy of Warsaw. After the duchy's dissolution, the town was part of the Free City of Kraków from 1815 to 1846, and then it was reannexed by the Austrian Empire. In the 19th century the area of Trzebinia went through the period of industrialization. In 1804–1843, five coal mines, two zinc mills and a glass factory were opened here. On September 6, 1817, the village received its town charter, and in the second half of the 19th century, further coal mines were opened here, as well as a calamine mine. In the early 20th century, Trzebinia had oil refinery, power plant, and cement mill. In 1903, the Salvatorians settled here, who in 1908 began construction of a church.

=== World War II ===
On September 1, 1939, the first day of the German invasion of Poland and World War II, Trzebinia was bombed by the Luftwaffe. On September 5, 1939, invading Wehrmacht soldiers mass murdered 97 people in the town. The town was then occupied by Germany, and on October 9, 1939, it was directly annexed into Nazi Germany; the border with the General Government was a few kilometers east, near Dulowa.

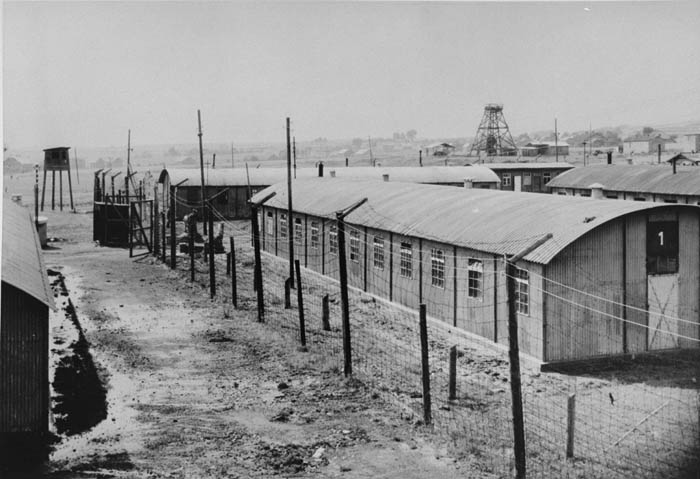
Local subcamp of the Auschwitz concentration camp

During the war, two forced labor subcamps of the Stalag VIII-B/344 prisoner-of-war camp were located within the present-day town limits of Trzebinia: the E738 subcamp in Trzebinia and the E565 subcamp in Siersza Wodna (then a separate village, now incorporated into Trzebinia). In the E565 subcamp, British and other Commonwealth prisoners of war were imprisoned and forced to work in a coal mine, and their living accommodation was in wooden huts by the river. More Stalag VIII-B/344 POWs were transferred in January 1944 from Otmuchów in Lower Silesia to the E738 subcamp at the Trzebinia oil refinery. All 45 members of the detachment were from Commonwealth countries. A document at the Auschwitz-Birkenau State Museum confirming arrival of POW Work Detachment E738 at Trzebinia is dated 25 February 1944. In 1944, the Germans sent kidnapped Polish children from Trzebinia to the Potulice concentration camp.

In August 1944, the E738 subcamp of Stalag VIII-B/344 was replaced by a subcamp of the Auschwitz concentration camp. The Germans sent the British POWs back to Stalag VIII-B/344, and replaced them with hundreds of new prisoners, mostly from German-occupied Poland and Hungary. It was one of the largest subcamps of the Auschwitz III-Monowitz concentration camp and provided forced labor for a nearby oil refinery. In August 1944, the refinery at Trzebinia was bombed by the United States Air Force. Due to the high death rate among the prisoners, the SS established a crematorium in the subcamp. In January 1945, as the Red Army resumed its offensive and advanced from the east, the prisoners were marched to Rybnik in the so-called Death March. Many of them died from the bitter cold and exhaustion. From Rybnik the Germans deported them to the Sachsenhausen and Bergen-Belsen concentration camps. On January 23, 1945, the Germans retreated.

=== Recent history ===
Until 1975, the town remained in Kraków Voivodeship. In 1961, the settlement of Wodna was incorporated into Trzebinia, and in 1969, after joining with the settlement of Siersza, the town was named Trzebinia-Siersza. In 1977, the name was changed to Trzebinia. The name Siersza Wodna survives as the name of a freight railway station.

== Economy ==
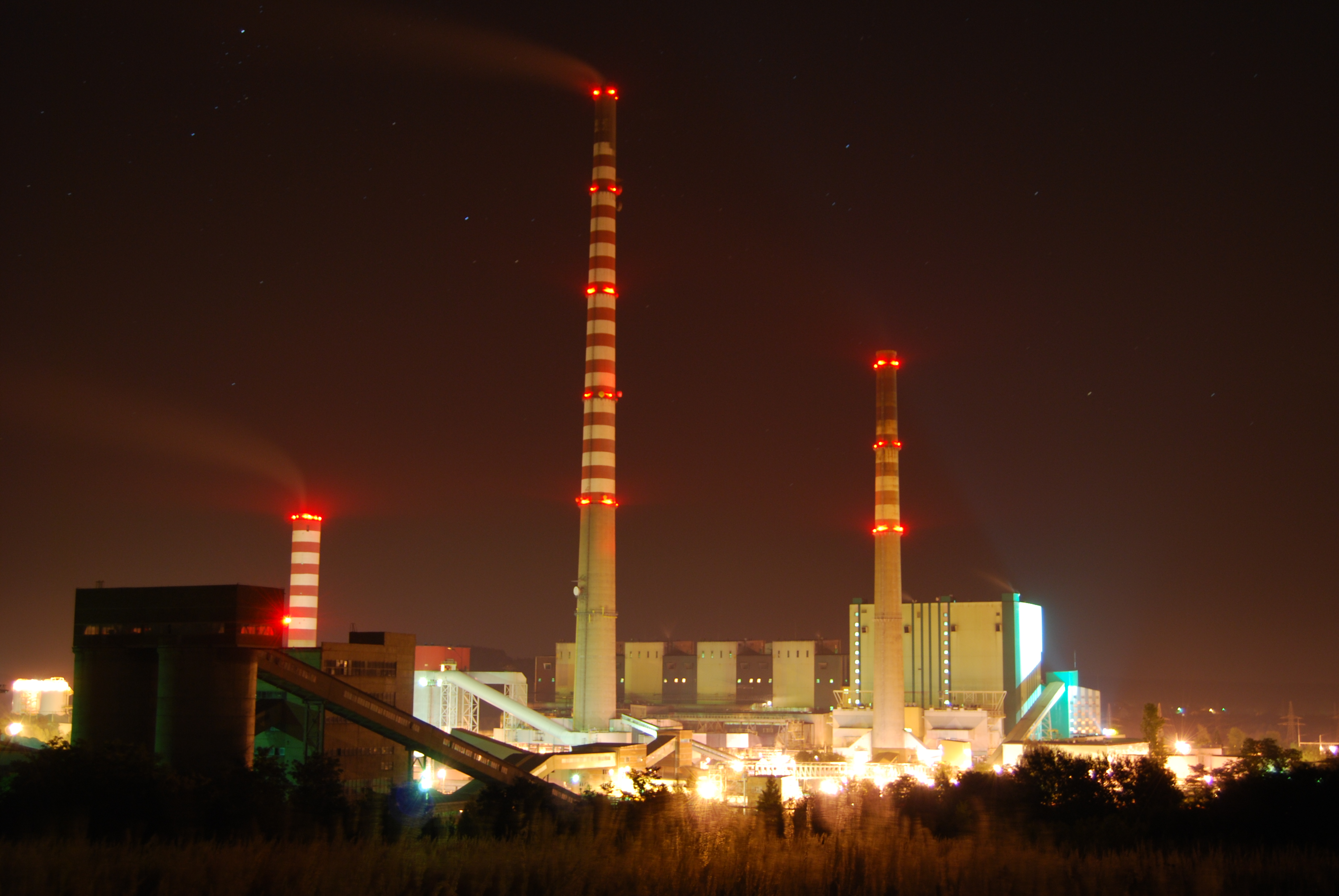
Siersza Power Station

Trzebina is home to the Siersza Power Station, a large oil refinery, Rafineria Trzebinia, which belongs to PKN Orlen and cement plant Gorka Cement (a part of Mapei). In 1957-1958 Mining Company Trzebionka was founded, and in 1962, Siersza II Power Plant began operating. Liquidated: zinc and lead mine - ZG Trzebionka, coal mine - KWK Siersza, metallurgical plants - ZM Trzebinia.

== Sports ==
The town is home to sports club Miejski Klub Sportowy Trzebinia–Siersza, founded in 2000.

== Notable people from Trzebinia ==
- Antonina Hoffmann, actress
- Dov Berish Weidenfeld, rabbi
