= Bolęcin, Lesser Poland Voivodeship =

Bolęcin
- Village
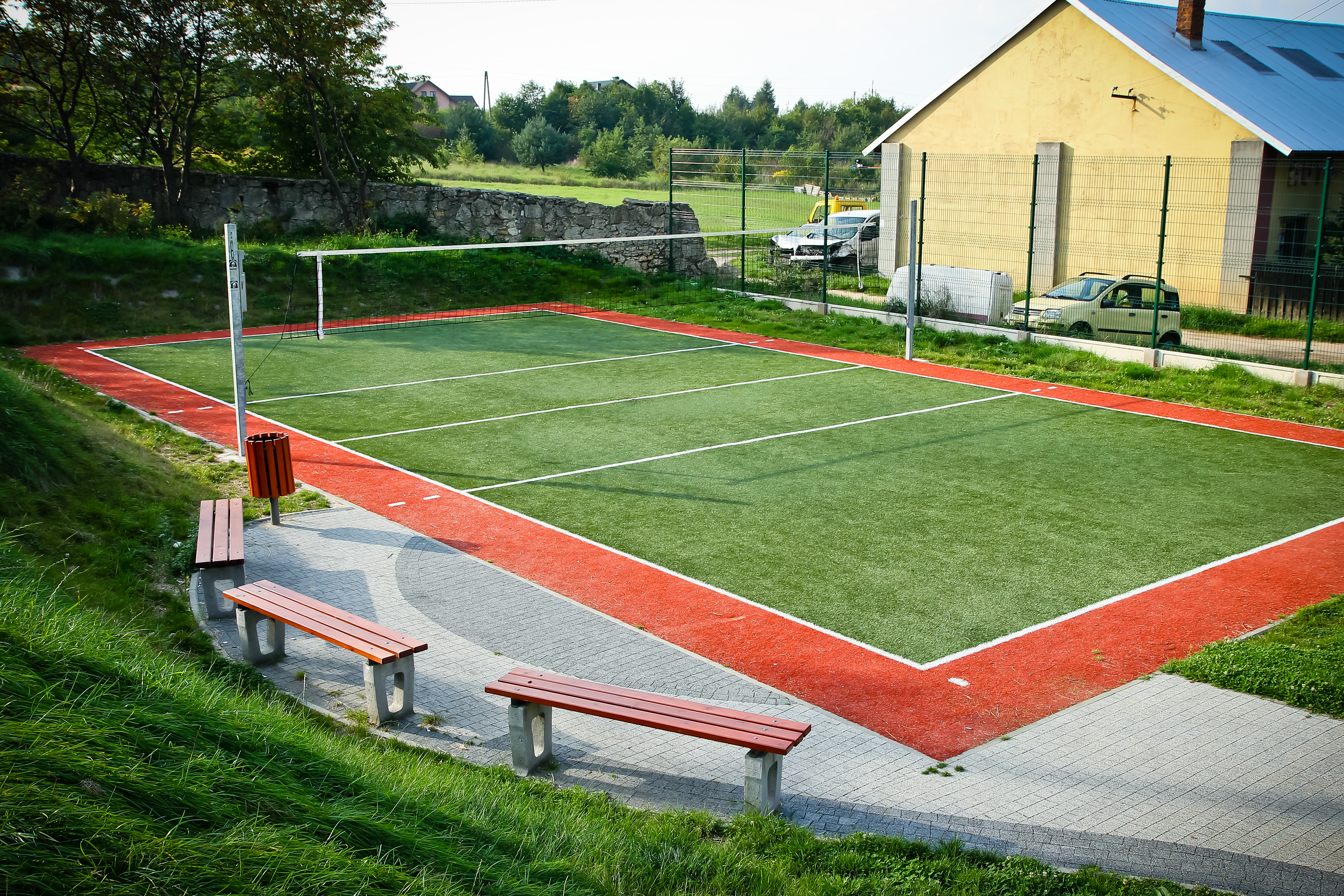
- School

- Location within Poland
- Coordinates: 50°8′N 19°29′E
- Country: Poland
- Voivodeship: Lesser Poland
- County: Chrzanów
- Gmina: Trzebinia
- Population: 1,793
- Website: http://www.bolecin.com.pl/

Bolęcin [bɔˈlɛnt͡ɕin] is a village in the administrative district of Gmina Trzebinia, within Chrzanów County, Lesser Poland Voivodeship, in southern Poland.
