= Sanka, Lesser Poland Voivodeship =

Sanka
- Village
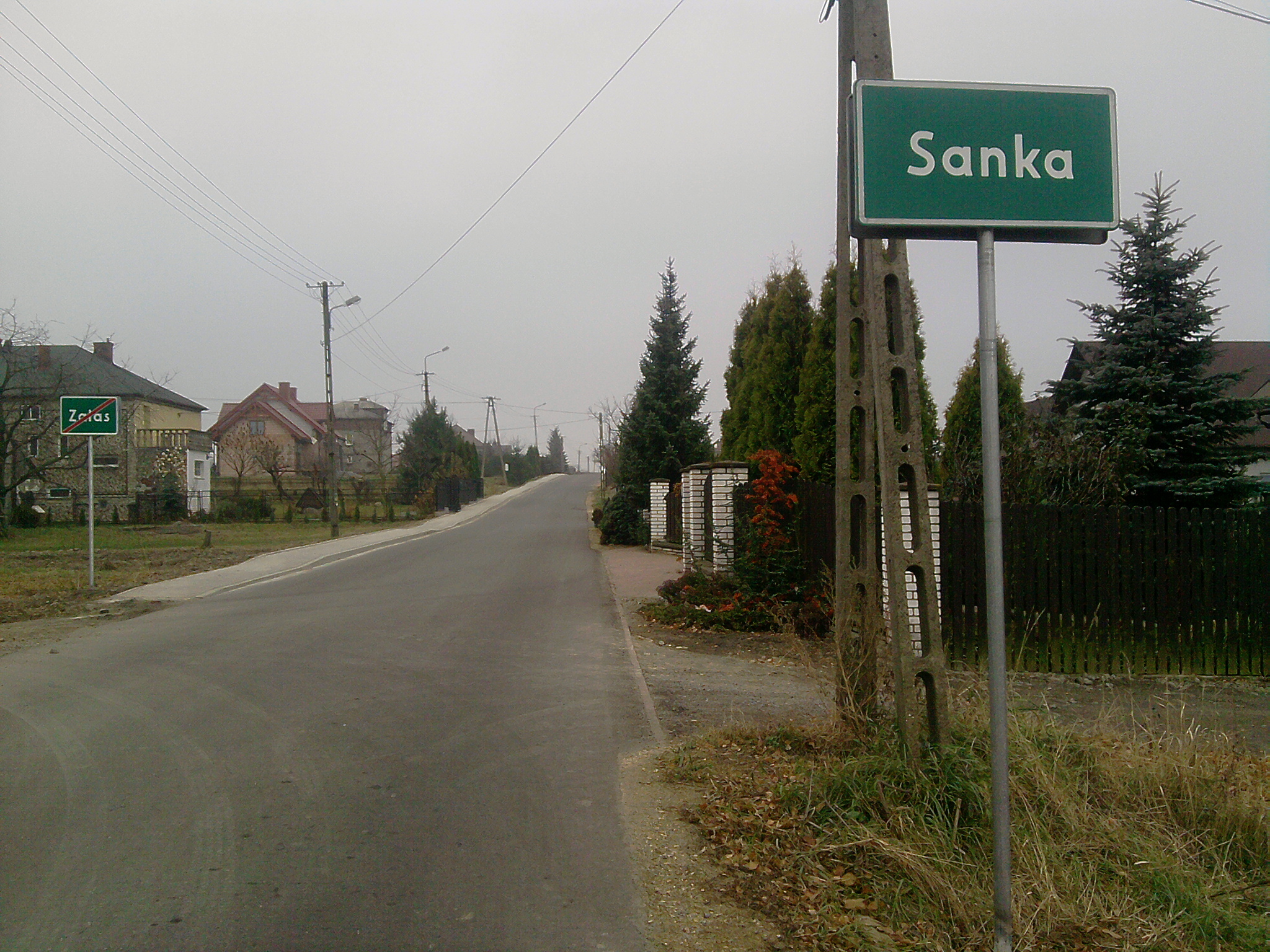

- Location within Poland
- Coordinates: 50°4′N 19°39′E
- Country: Poland
- Voivodeship: Lesser Poland
- County: Kraków
- Gmina: Krzeszowice
- Population: 1,116

Sanka [ˈsaŋka] is a village in the administrative district of Gmina Krzeszowice, within Kraków County, Lesser Poland Voivodeship, in southern Poland.
