= Zalas, Lesser Poland Voivodeship =

Zalas
- Village
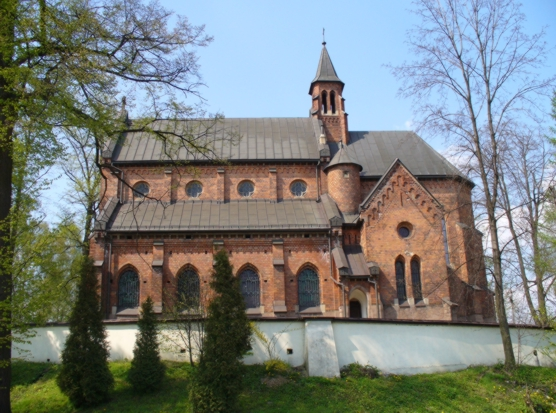
- Church

- Location within Poland
- Coordinates: 50°4′46″N 19°36′30″E
- Country: Poland
- Voivodeship: Lesser Poland
- County: Kraków
- Gmina: Krzeszowice

Zalas [ˈzalas] is a village in the administrative district of Gmina Krzeszowice, within Kraków County, Lesser Poland Voivodeship, in southern Poland.
