= Gmina Trzebinia =

Gmina Trzebinia Trzebinia Commune
- Gmina
- Flag Coat of arms
- Interactive map of Gmina Trzebinia
- Coordinates (Trzebinia): 50°10′N 19°29′E
- Country: Poland
- Voivodeship: Lesser Poland
- County: Chrzanów
- Seat: Trzebinia

Area
  - Total: 105.22 km^{2} (40.63 sq mi)

Population (2006)
  - Total: 33,959
  - Density: 322.74/km^{2} (835.90/sq mi)
  - Urban: 18,769
  - Rural: 15,190
- Website: http://www.trzebinia.pl

Gmina Trzebinia is an urban-rural gmina (administrative district) in Chrzanów County, Lesser Poland Voivodeship, in southern Poland. Its seat is the town of Trzebinia, which lies approximately 8 kilometres (5 mi) north-east of Chrzanów and 35 km (22 mi) west of the regional capital Kraków.

The gmina covers an area of 105.22 square kilometres (40.6 sq mi), and as of 2006 its total population is 33,959 (out of which the population of Trzebinia amounts to 18,769, and the population of the rural part of the gmina is 15,190).

The gmina contains part of the protected area called Kraków Valleys Landscape Park.

== Villages ==
Apart from the town of Trzebinia, Gmina Trzebinia contains the villages and settlements of Bolęcin, Czyżówka, Dulowa, Karniowice, Lgota, Młoszowa, Myślachowice, Piła Kościelecka, Płoki and Psary.

== Neighbouring gminas ==
Gmina Trzebinia is bordered by the towns of Bukowno and Jaworzno, and by the gminas of Alwernia, Chrzanów, Krzeszowice and Olkusz.
