= Plaza (disambiguation) =

A plaza, or town square, is an open public space used for various activities.

Plaza may also refer to:

== People ==
- Plaza (surname), including a list of people with the name
- Plaza (singer) (Michael Martin Kaminski, born 1997)

== Places ==
- Płaza, Małopolska, Poland
- Plaza, Long Beach, California, U.S.
- Plaza, North Dakota, U.S.
- Plaza, Washington, U.S.
- Plaza Municipality, Miranda, Venezuela

== Other uses ==
- Plaza (album), by Quilt, 2016
- Plaza, Port Talbot, a former cinema in Port Talbot, Wales, UK
- Plymouth Plaza, a 1950s automobile

== See also ==
- The Plaza (disambiguation)
- La Plaza (disambiguation)
- Plaza Apartments (disambiguation)
- Plaza Building (disambiguation)
- Plaza Cinema (disambiguation)
- Plaza Hotel (disambiguation)
- Plaza Theatre (disambiguation)
