= La Plaza (disambiguation) =

La Plaza may refer to:

== United States ==
- LA Plaza de Cultura y Artes, a Mexican-American museum in Los Angeles, California
- La Plaza (Palm Springs), an open-air shopping center in Palm Springs, California
- La Plaza Cultural de Armando Perez, a community garden and green space in New York, New York
- La Plaza Mall, a regional shopping mall in McAllen, Texas

== Other countries ==
- The Opera House (Toronto) or La Plaza Theatre, a music venue in Ontario, Canada
- La Plaza, Pichilemu, a village in Cardenal Caro Province, Chile
- La Plaza, a parish in Teverga, Spain
- La Plaza de Paraguachí, a town on Isla Margarita, in Nueva Esparta, Venezuela

== See also ==
- The Plaza (disambiguation)
- Plaza (disambiguation)
- Plaza Theatre (disambiguation)
