= King-Lincoln Bronzeville =

Neighborhood in Columbus, Ohio

- Neighborhood of Columbus, Ohio
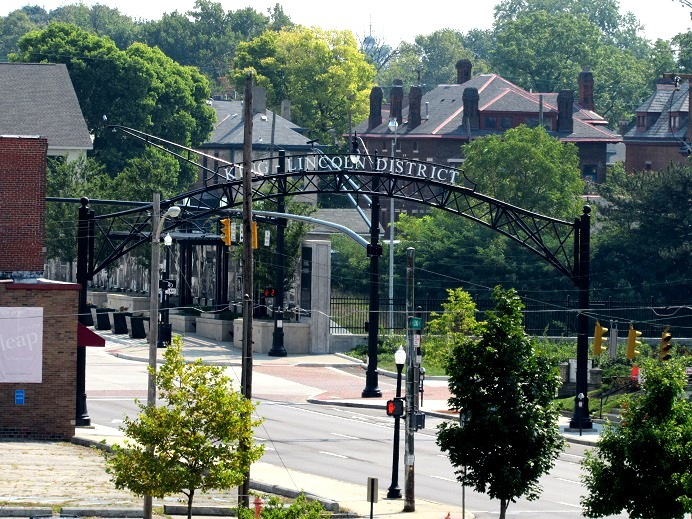
- Interactive map of King-Lincoln Bronzeville
- Coordinates: 39°58′08″N 82°58′30″W
- Country: United States
- State: Ohio
- County: Franklin
- City: Columbus

King-Lincoln Bronzeville is a historically African-American neighborhood in Columbus, Ohio. Originally known as Bronzeville by the residents of the community, it was renamed the King-Lincoln District by Mayor Michael B. Coleman's administration to highlight the historical significance of the district's King Arts Complex and Lincoln Theatre, amid collaborations with investors and developers to revitalize the neighborhood.

In 2009, the King-Lincoln Bronzeville Neighborhood Association asked that the neighborhood be renamed to Bronzeville to reflect its history.

== History ==
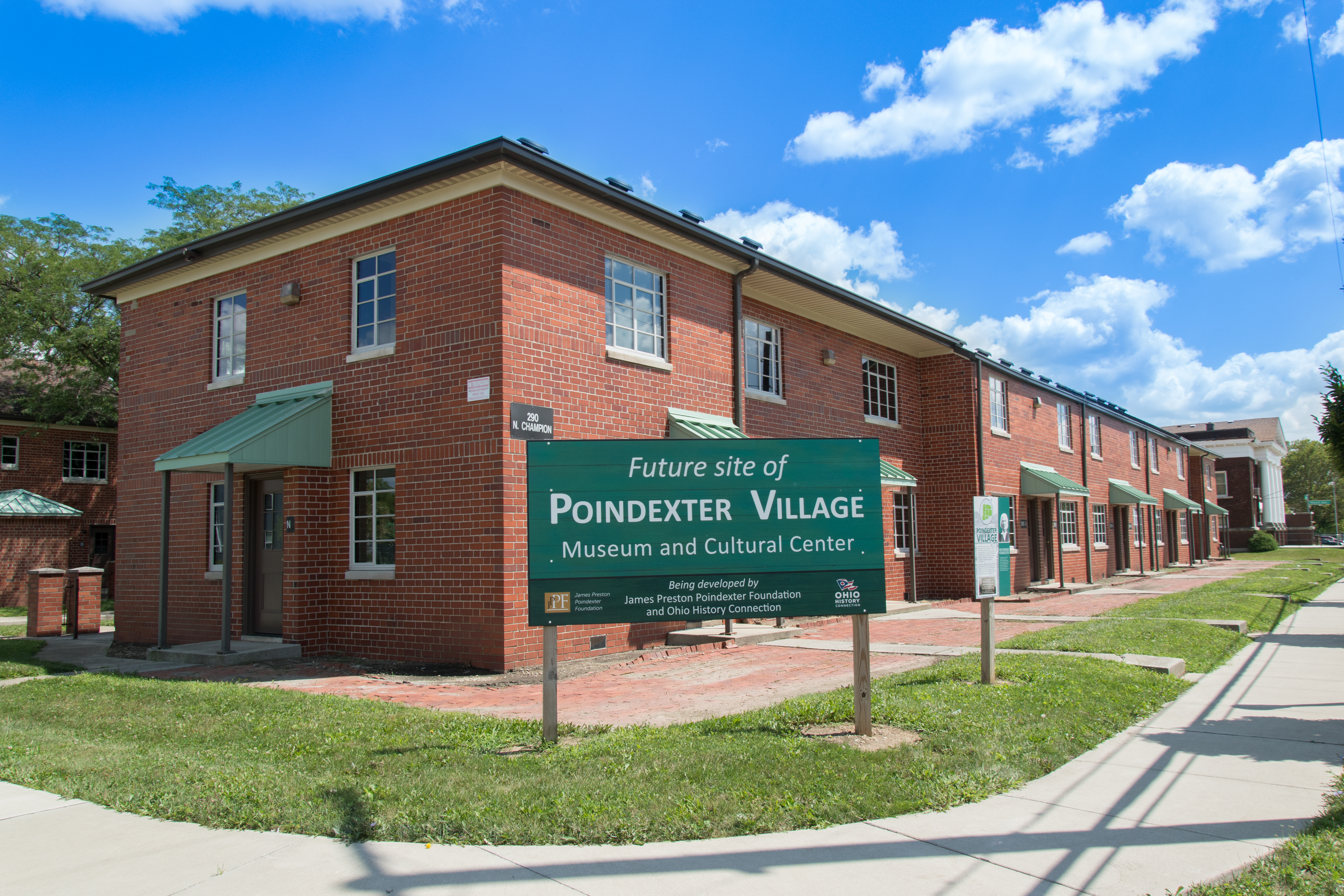
Remaining building at Poindexter Village

The origins of the neighborhood date back to the 19th century when freed and escaped slaves from across the Confederate South began to settle in Columbus. Originally settled more southward by the Scioto River, many Black families moved eastward in search of employment in domestic service work and industrial factories. Over the course of the next century, the community expanded to the boundaries of the current day district. The Black population grew as a result of the Great Migration after World War I, restrictive housing covenants in other areas, and White flight, leading Bronzeville to become the most populated African American neighborhood of the city.

By the 1930s, the neighborhood had become a self-sustaining community centered on Black businesses, services, and life. Bronzeville developed into an active entertainment district with four theaters (Lincoln, Empress, Cameo, and Pythian), and multiple jazz establishments. As the community developed, it grew to provide its own hospitals, schools, churches, and commercial establishments. The district would later serve as a congregational site for many civil rights activists in the 1950s and 1960s, including Martin Luther King Jr.

Having remained a self-sustained community for nearly half a century, Bronzeville started to decline in 1962 with the construction of I-71. The highway segmented the district and now serves as the westernmost boundary of the district. Additionally, the lifting of many housing covenants and restrictions encouraged many middle and upper class Black families to leave the district and move to the suburbs of Columbus. Many business owners left the district and it quickly developed into a neighborhood ridden by unemployment, poverty, and crime.

In partnership with community organizations and associations, the City of Columbus initiated the King-Lincoln District Plan in 2001, a comprehensive revitalization plan aimed at improving the economic well-being and quality of life in the district. The plan was responsible for the renovation of the King Arts Complex (formerly Pythian Theatre), the Long Street bridge, and businesses in the district. The neighborhood has become a focus of the city's revitalization efforts which include renovation of the historic Lincoln Theatre and construction of new condominiums and expansion of retail space along Mt. Vernon Avenue and Long Street, which hosts the annual Long Street Tour cycling event.

== Associations ==
The district's prosperity was largely due to many community organizations and associations that helped support businesses, education, and civic life. Organizations such as the Long Street Business Association, Bronzeville Neighborhood Association, and The Near East Side, have been the main supporters for the preservation and revitalization of the historic district. William-Amanze Pinckney started the Bronzeville Neighborhood Association in the early 1990s. He wrote the history of the area titled, "An African American Presence: The Mayor of Bronzeville" in 1998.

== Geography ==
The King-Lincoln neighborhood is bound by Broad Street to the South, Taylor Avenue to the East, Atcheson Street to the North, and I-71 to the West. Originally a much larger area, the district has continually been redefined with new boundaries in response to the development of the city of Columbus. It is considered to be a neighborhood within the Near East side and is surrounded by downtown Columbus, Old Towne East, and the Mount Vernon and Woodland Park neighborhoods.

== Structures and landmarks ==
=== Lincoln Theatre ===
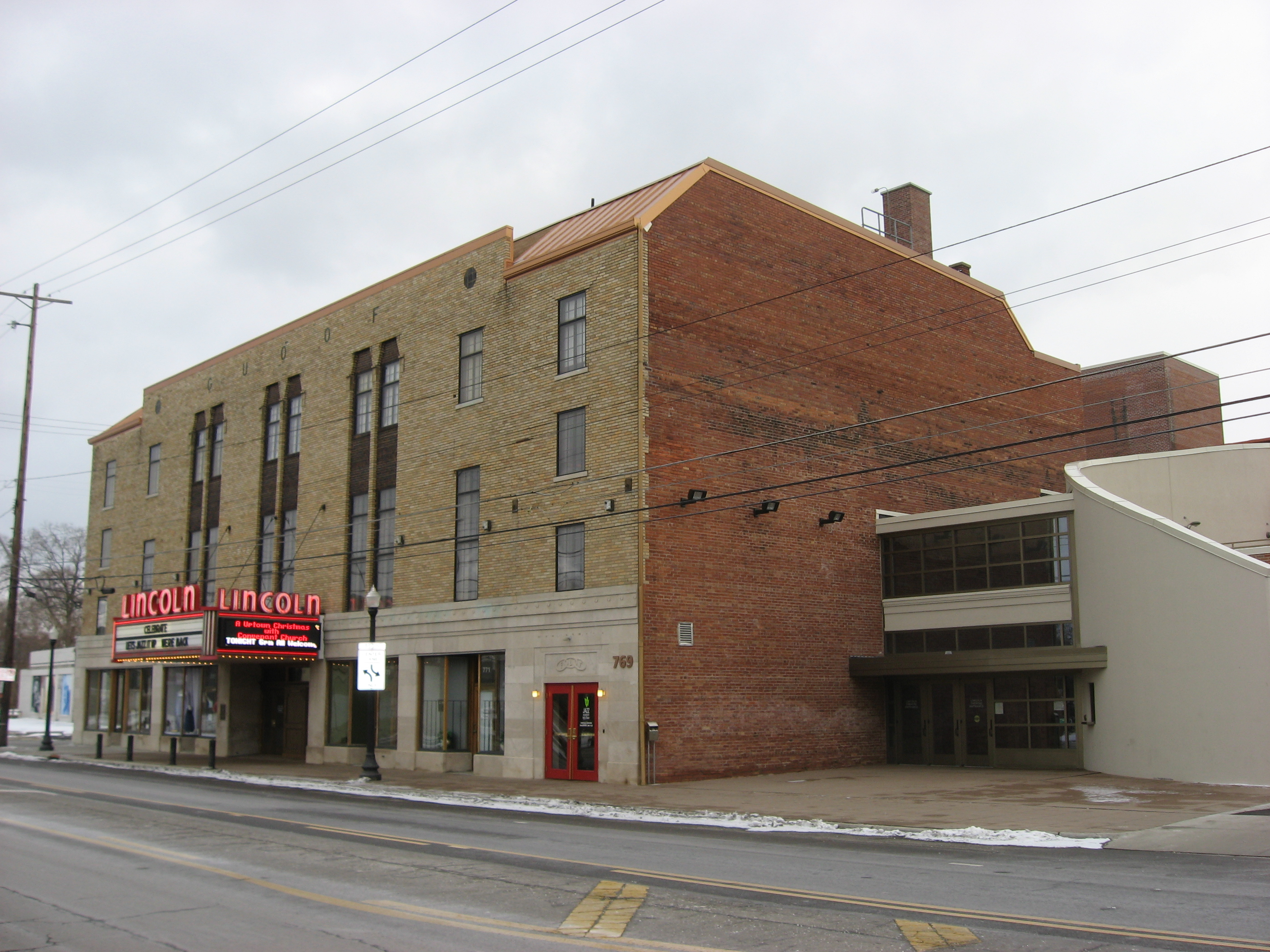
Lincoln Theatre

The Lincoln Theatre, originally named "The Ogden Theatre", is a 582-seat performing arts venue located at 769 E. Long Street. First developed by local entrepreneur Al Jackson and designed in the Egyptian Revival style by architect Carl Anderson, The Lincoln Theatre opened on November 26, 1928. It was soon a nexus of excitement, entertainment and community life in the predominantly African-American neighborhood. The Ogden was renamed the Lincoln Theatre in 1939 and continued to operate as a movie theatre and a nationally recognized hotspot for jazz.

=== Long Street Bridge and Cultural Wall ===
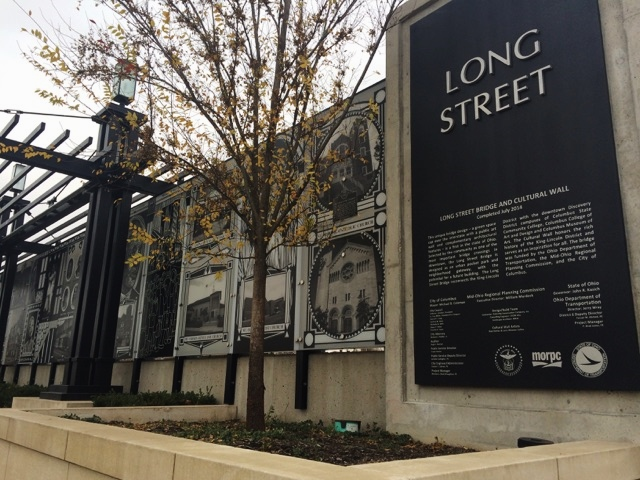
Long Street Bridge and Cultural Wall

The Long Street Bridge is located right above 1-71 and serves as a pedestrian link between the Discovery District and King-Lincoln District. It contains a 240 ft cultural wall, designed by local artists Kojo Kamau and Larry Winston Collins. The mural is made up of 60 panels displaying 139 images connected to the lively history of the King-Lincoln District. The bridge is one of the final pieces to the Ohio Department of Transportation's rebuild of the I-71/670 interchange Downtown.

=== Second Baptist Church ===
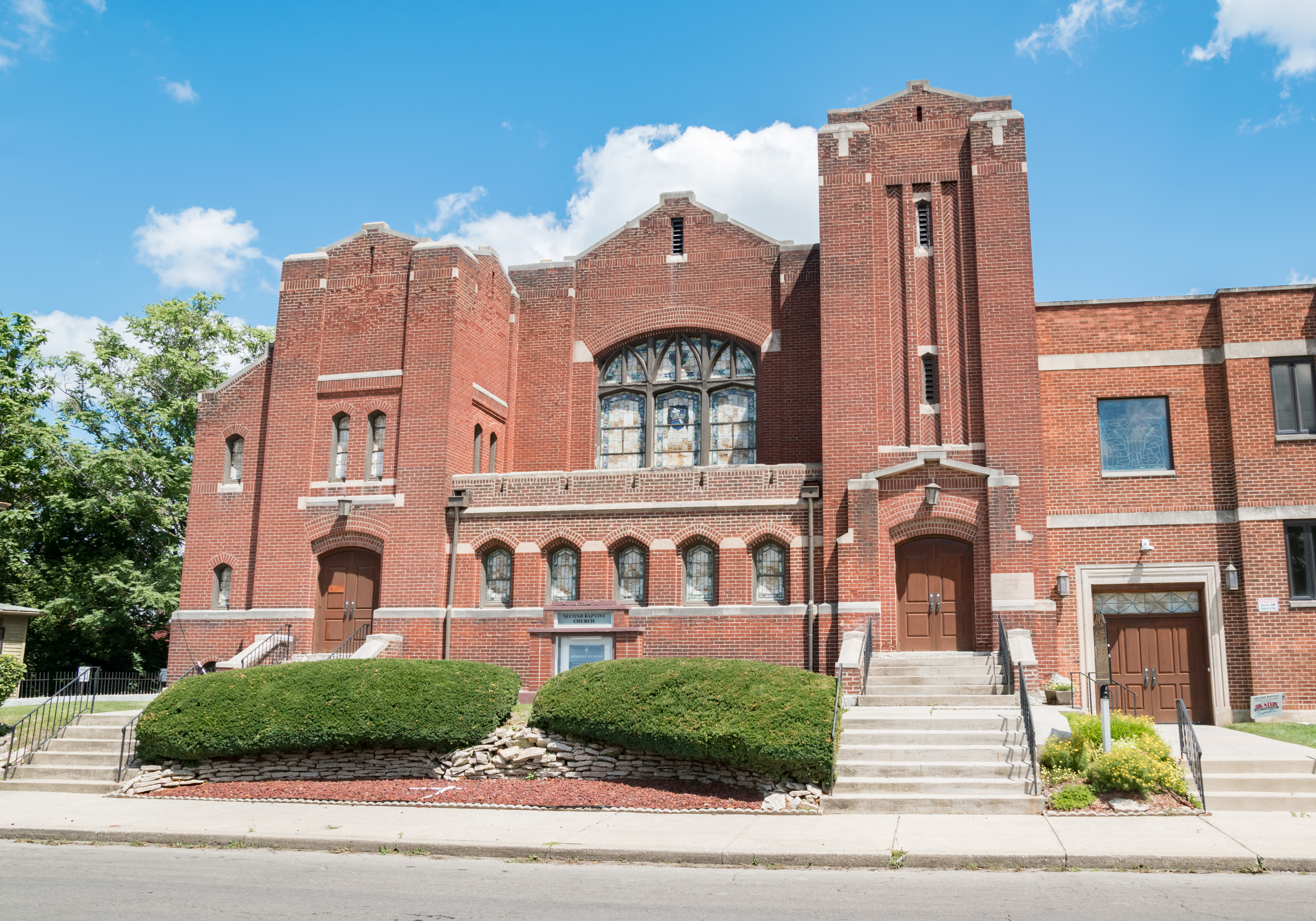
Second Baptist Church

The Second Baptist Church was founded in 1824 and is the first black Baptist church in Columbus, Ohio. The church building was built from 1907 to 1908. Pastor James Preston Poindexter, Second Baptist Church's pastor in 1858, is historically known for his involvement in the underground railroad as an enthusiastic abolitionist. Through his civil rights activism, he helped shaped the neighborhoods of King-Lincoln Bronzeville.

=== The King Art Complex ===
The King Arts Complex opened in March 1987 and officially was completed in 1989. The King Arts Complex offers performing, cultural and educational programs that provide high artistic merit, varied and diverse experiences, and which increase and disseminate knowledge regarding the vast and significant contributions of African-Americans to the culture and history of America and the world. The King Arts Complex serves as a major anchor for development in the King-Lincoln District. It is also an oasis for cultural and educational activities as well.

=== East Broad Street Presbyterian Church ===
On September 20, 1887, The Presbytery officially established the Broad Street Presbyterian Church, and selected Rev. Marsten as the first pastor. Many criticized the move saying it was too far away from downtown, and was later considered "a smart strategic move" because of the growing experienced in the near east side.

=== Martin Luther King Jr. Library ===
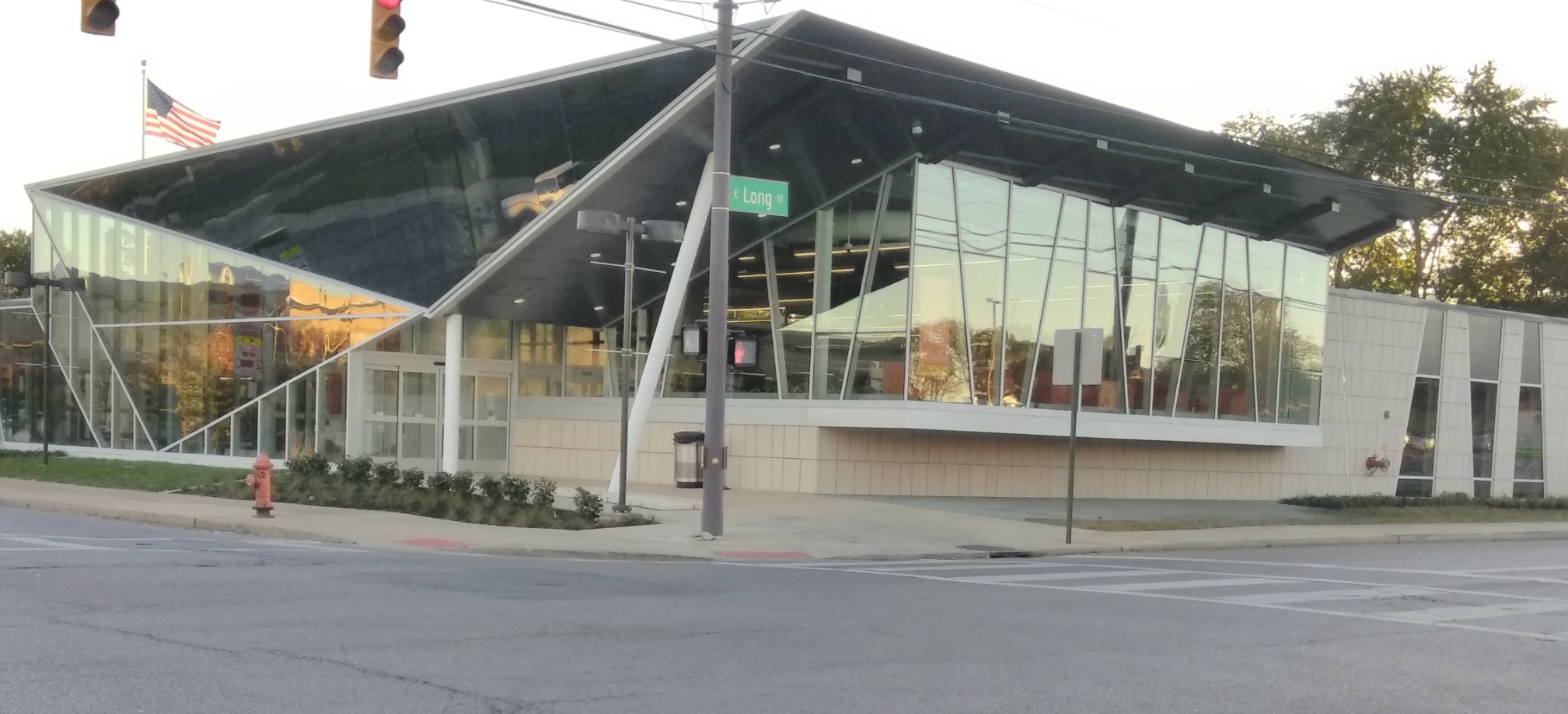
The new Martin Luther King Jr. Library days after opening

The neighborhood's branch of the Columbus Metropolitan Library was dedicated in November 1968. It was the first public library in the U.S. named for Dr. Martin Luther King, Jr, dedicated by his father only months after King's assassination. The 1968 library was designed by Leon Ransom Jr., who ran Columbus's first Black-led architecture firm. In 2018, a replacement building was constructed for the branch, dedicated by Dr. King's son Martin Luther King III in October 2018. A historical marker was installed outside the new branch in 2023, honoring Leon Ransom and the branch library's history. The original building at 1600 East Long Street was acquired by The Ohio State University and renovated to create a community wellness center that opened in May 2024.

== Public park ==
=== Mayme Moore Park ===
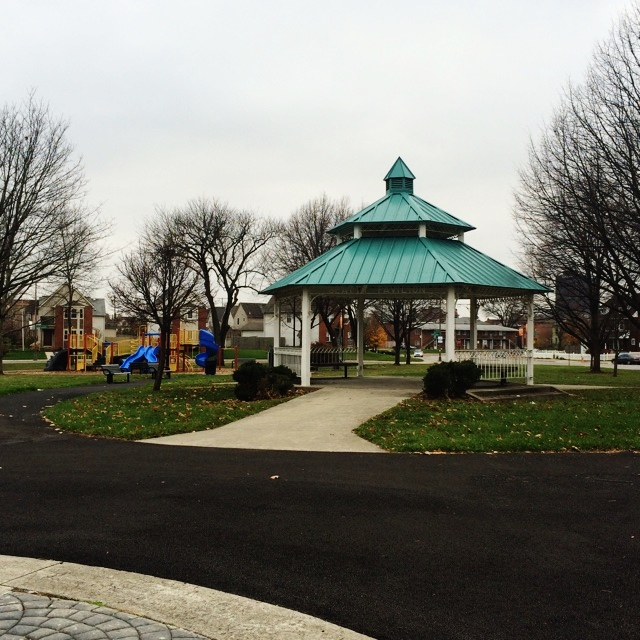
Mayme Moore Park

Mayme Moore Park has a total of 2.30 acres. The park location is at 240 Martin Luther King Jr. Blvd Columbus, OH 43203 and adjacent to The King Arts Complex. Mayme Moore Park is the most popular park in the Bronzeville King-Lincoln District. It is a neighborhood park and an area for community gatherings, activities and celebrations. Mayme Moore Park hosts various community events such as the Free Jazz Series hosted by The King Arts Complex. Mayme Moore Park has also been the home of Columbus Community Pride since 2018. Every Thursday in the summer, the Free Jazz Series is open free to the community to enjoy jazz musician performances and to participate in various family friendly activities.

== Gallery ==
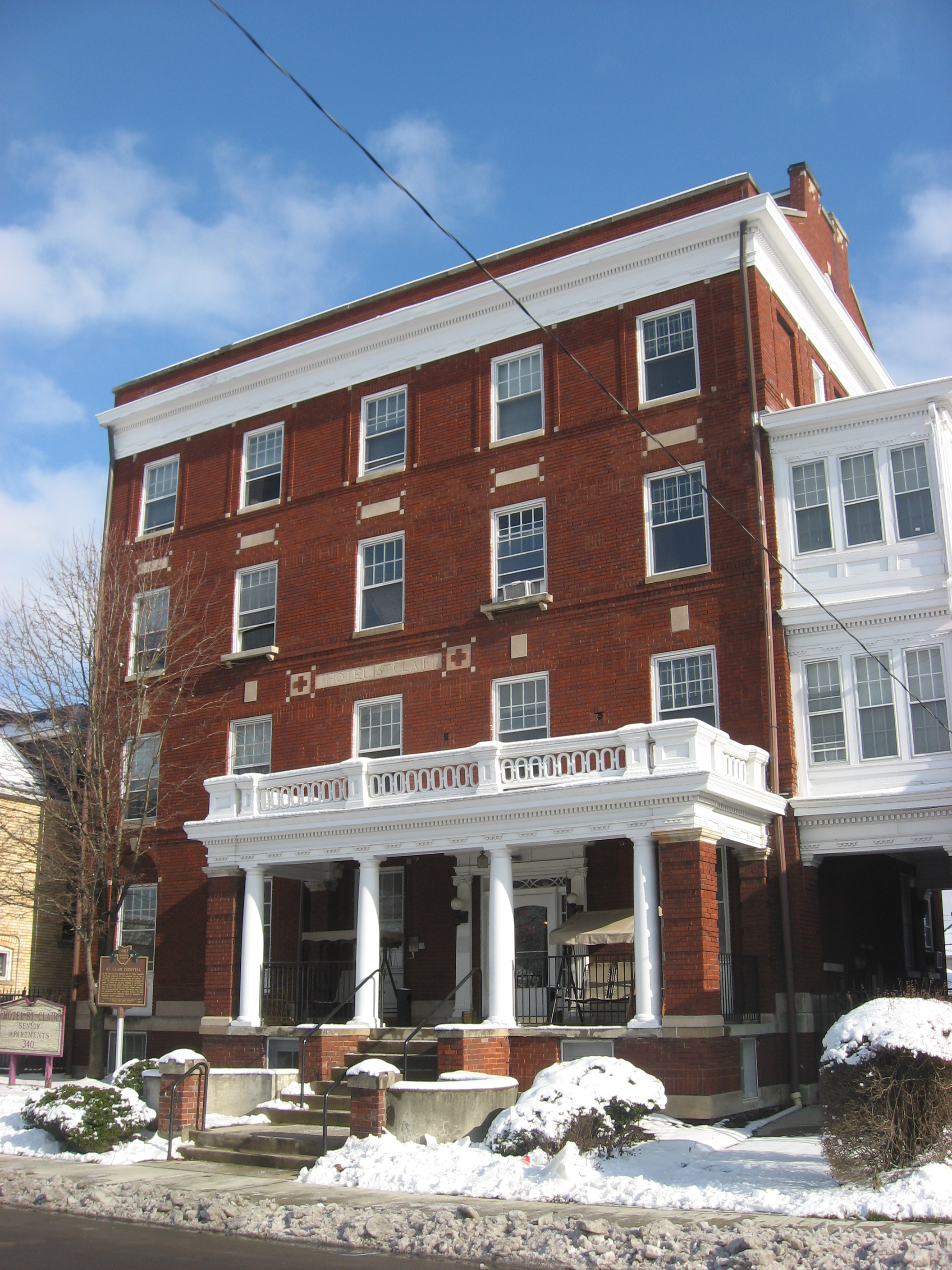
St. Clair Hospital

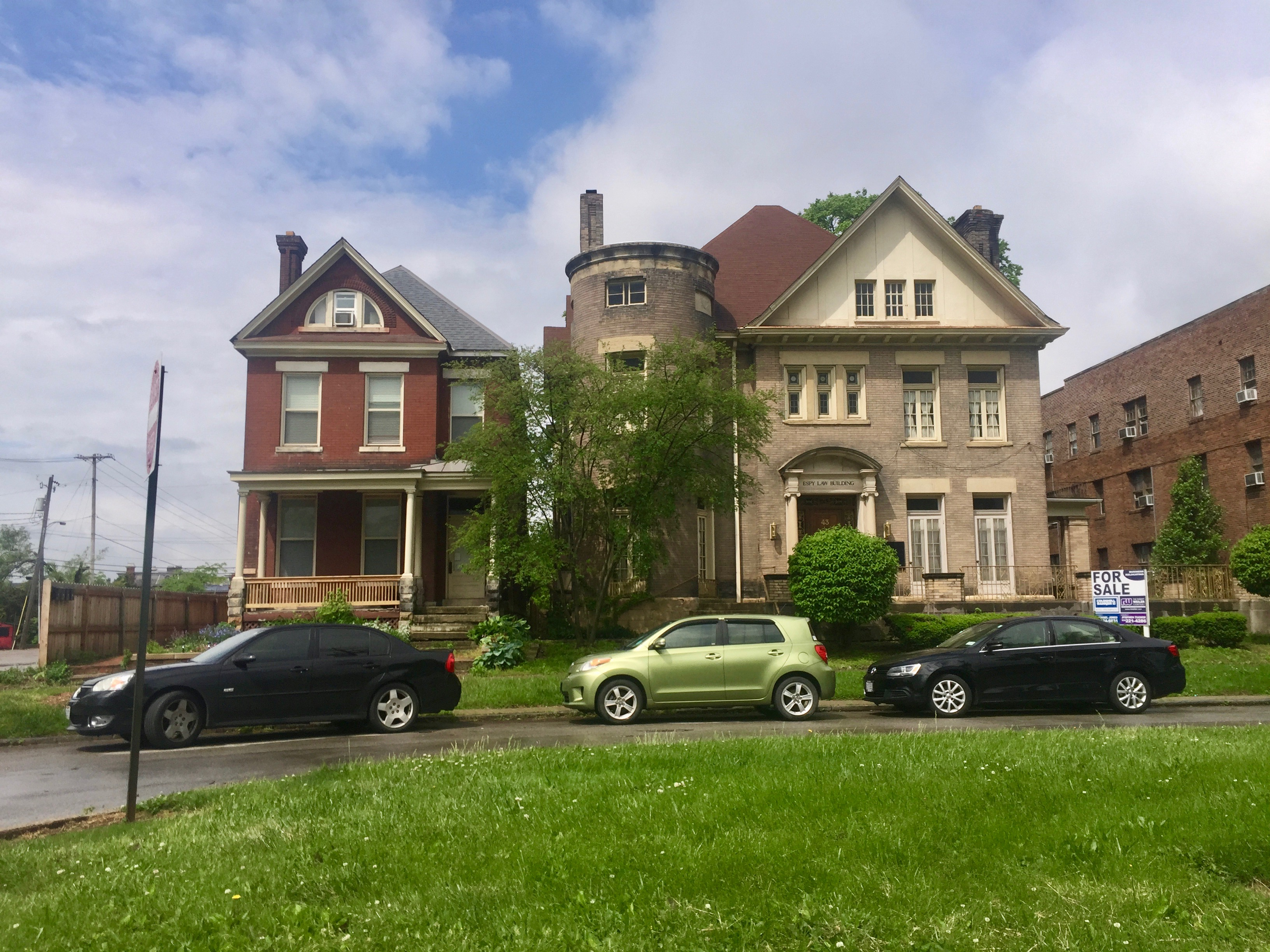
Historic houses in Hamilton Park

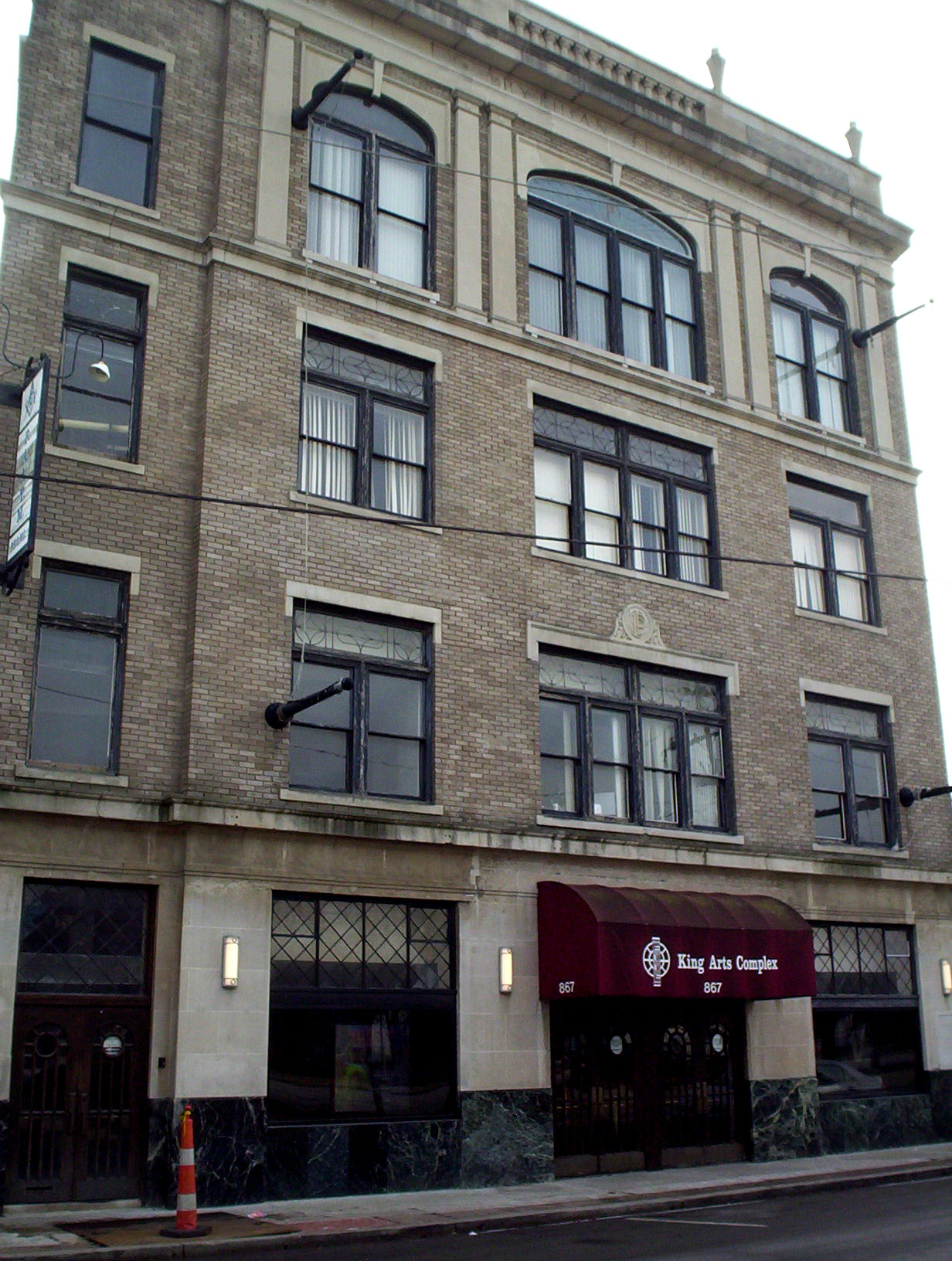
King Arts Complex

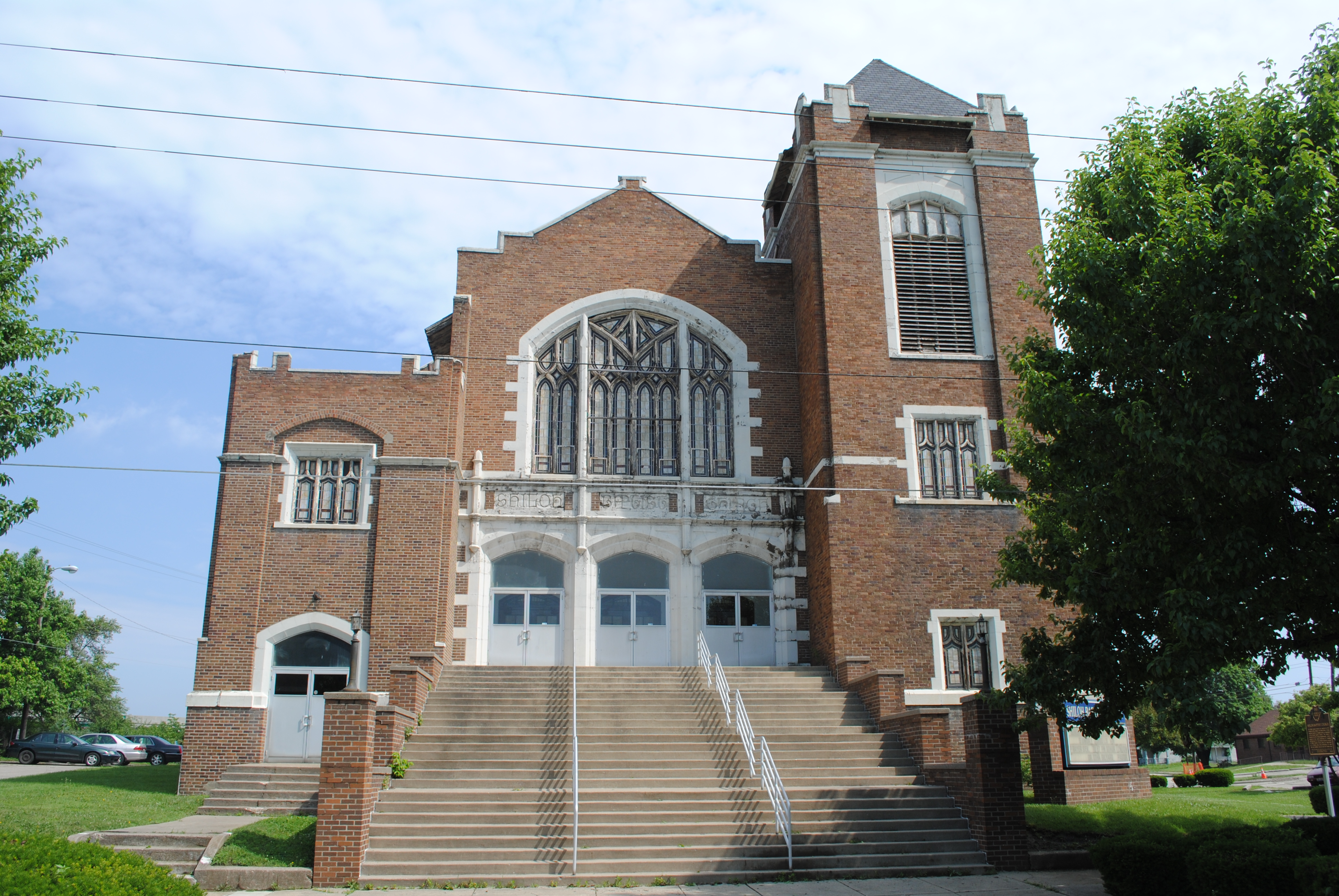
Shiloh Baptist Church

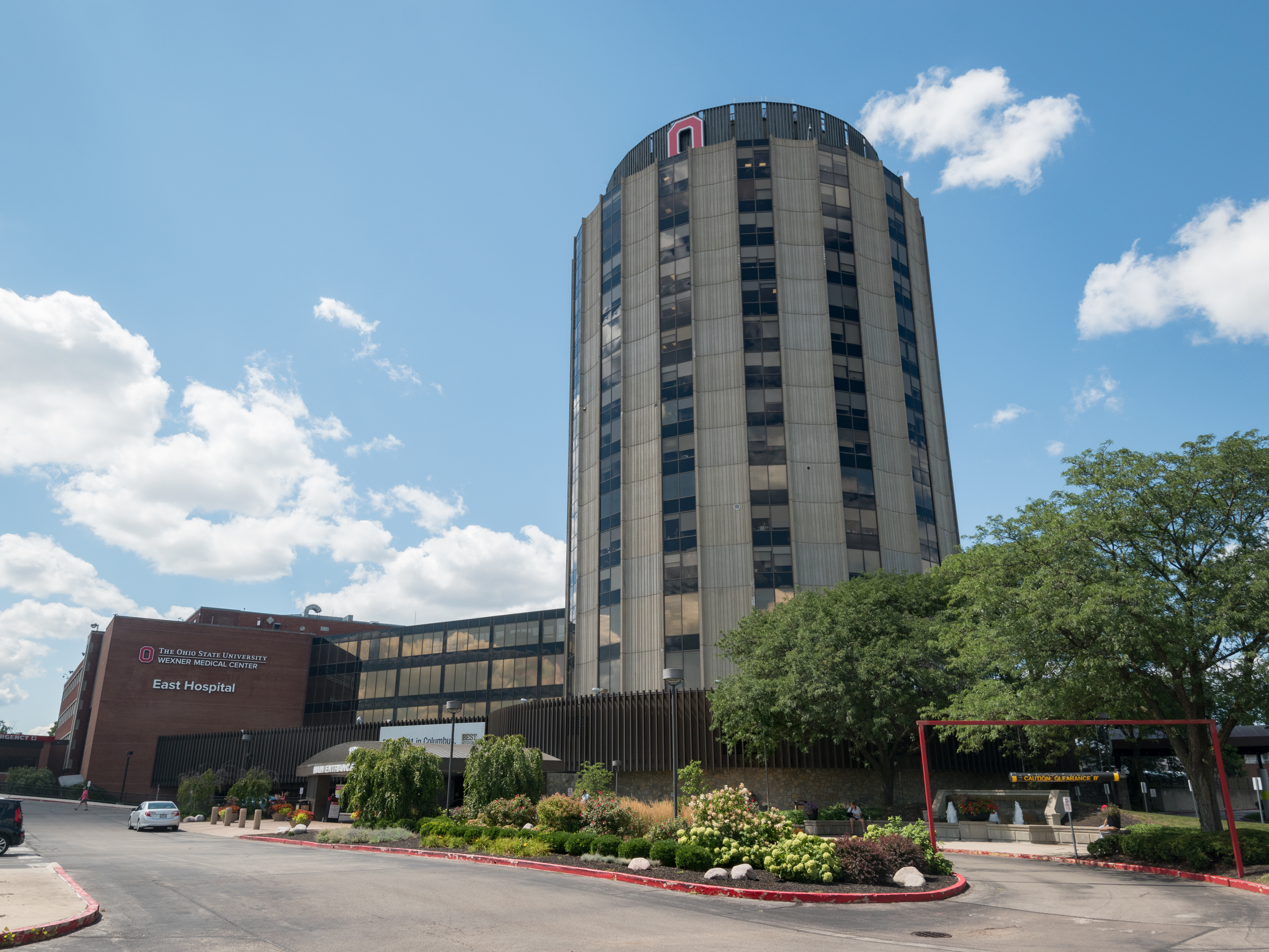
Ohio State East Hospital

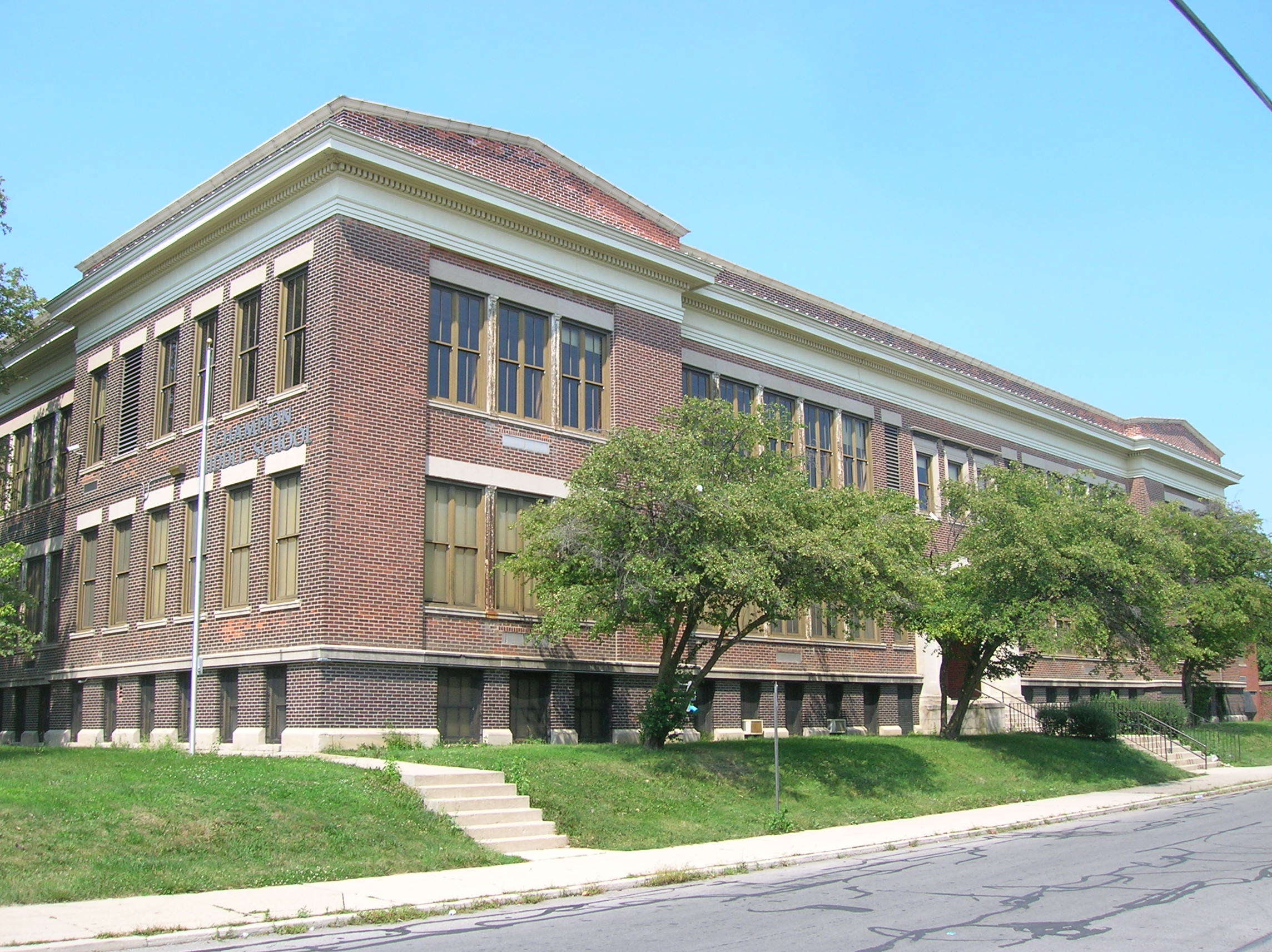
Champion Avenue School (demolished)

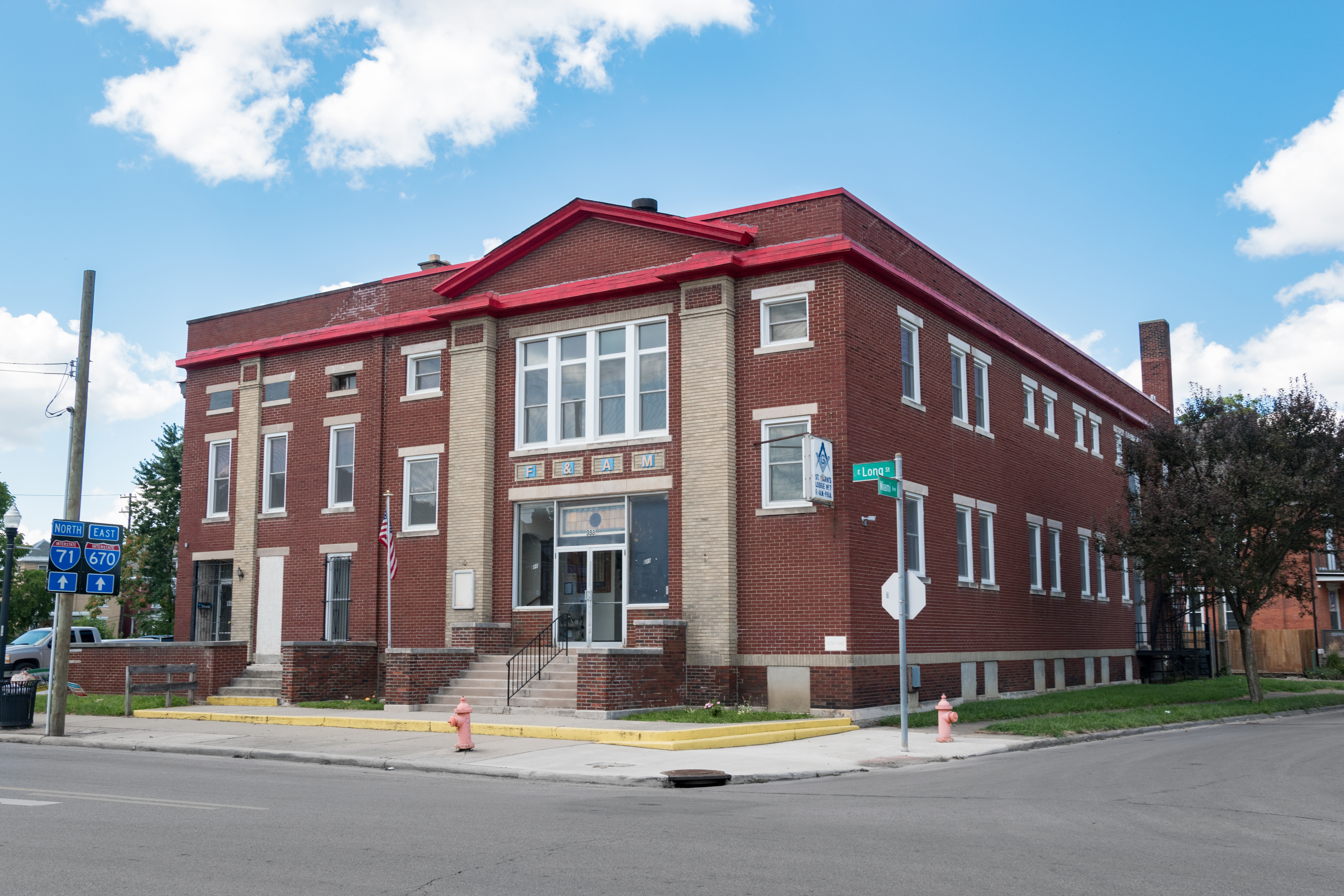
St. Mark's Masonic Temple No. 7

== See also ==
- Mt. Vernon Avenue Commercial Building
- Plaza Hotel (Columbus, Ohio)
