= Shiloh Baptist Church (Columbus, Ohio) =

- U.S. National Register of Historic Places
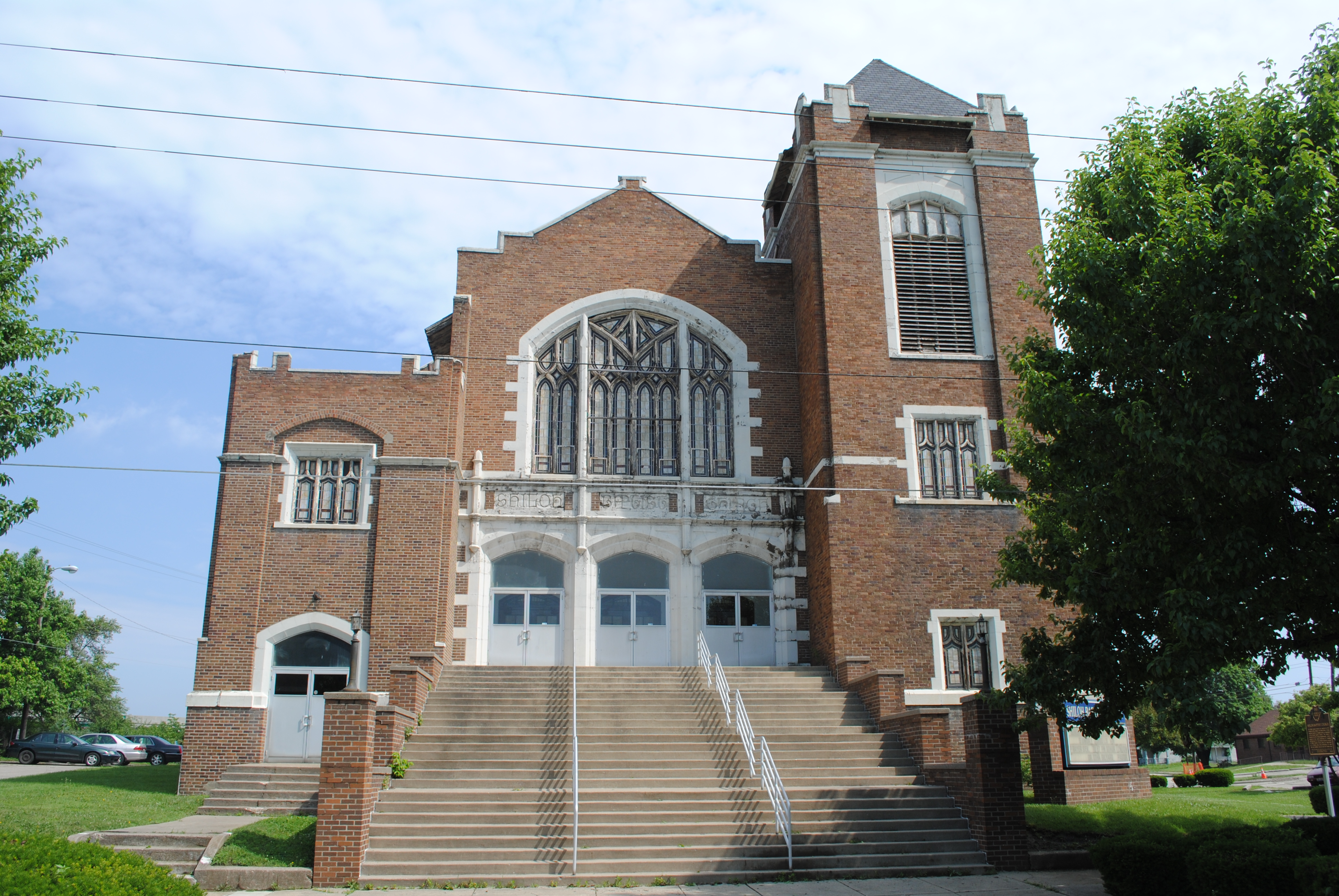
- Front of the church
- Interactive map highlighting the church's location
- Location: 720 Mt. Vernon Ave., Columbus, Ohio
- Coordinates: 39°58′13″N 82°58′55″W
- Area: Less than 1 acre (0.40 ha)
- Built: 1923
- Architect: A.O. Day Construction Co.; Rev. James H. Burks
- Architectural style: Gothic Revival
- NRHP reference No.: 04001288
- Added to NRHP: December 4, 2004

Shiloh Baptist Church is a historic Baptist church in King-Lincoln Bronzeville, Columbus, Ohio. One of the oldest black churches in the city, it has been active since the 1860s, and its 1920s building has been named a historic site.

Built of brick on a concrete foundation, the Gothic Revival church features limestone details and is covered with an asphalt roof. The major part of the church is on the second story, sitting above a basement with windows at ground level; the main part of the building is entered through large doors atop a flight of exterior stairs. Squat rectangular towers with pyramidal roofs sit on the front corners of the building, with simple rectangular windows above small doorways. The plan partially reflects traditional ecclesiastical architecture, with a gabled roof being interrupted by cross gables on the sides. Many of the windows, as well as the doorways, are wide ogive arches.

Shiloh Baptist Church was formed by a group of former members of the city's Second Baptist Church. Seeing the city's black population increasing rapidly, especially on the near east side, Second Baptist leaders asked for volunteers to leave and form a new church; these volunteers formed the entire charter membership of the new Shiloh church. From their first meeting in 1869 until 1871, they worshipped in a rented property at Gay and Fourth Streets downtown, after which they moved a few blocks eastward to Cleveland Avenue and Long Street. The congregation again moved in 1923 upon the completion of the present building on Mount Vernon Avenue, significantly farther east than the previous houses of worship. A minister, James Burks, was responsible for the design, with additional work being performed by the A.O. Day Construction Company. The congregation came close to losing the building during the Great Depression, due to its inability to pay the mortgage, but was delivered by an unexpected act of mercy: upon obtaining title through foreclosure, the bank promptly contracted to return the property to the church. Since that time, the building has become recognized as one of the premier components of the surrounding neighborhood, Mount Vernon.

As the third oldest black church in Columbus, younger only than the parent church and a congregation of the African Methodist Episcopal Church, the congregation has long played a significant part in the life of Mount Vernon. In recognition of its significance in local history, the building was listed on the National Register of Historic Places in 2004. The congregation remains active in the wider Baptist community as a part of the Eastern Union Missionary Baptist Association.

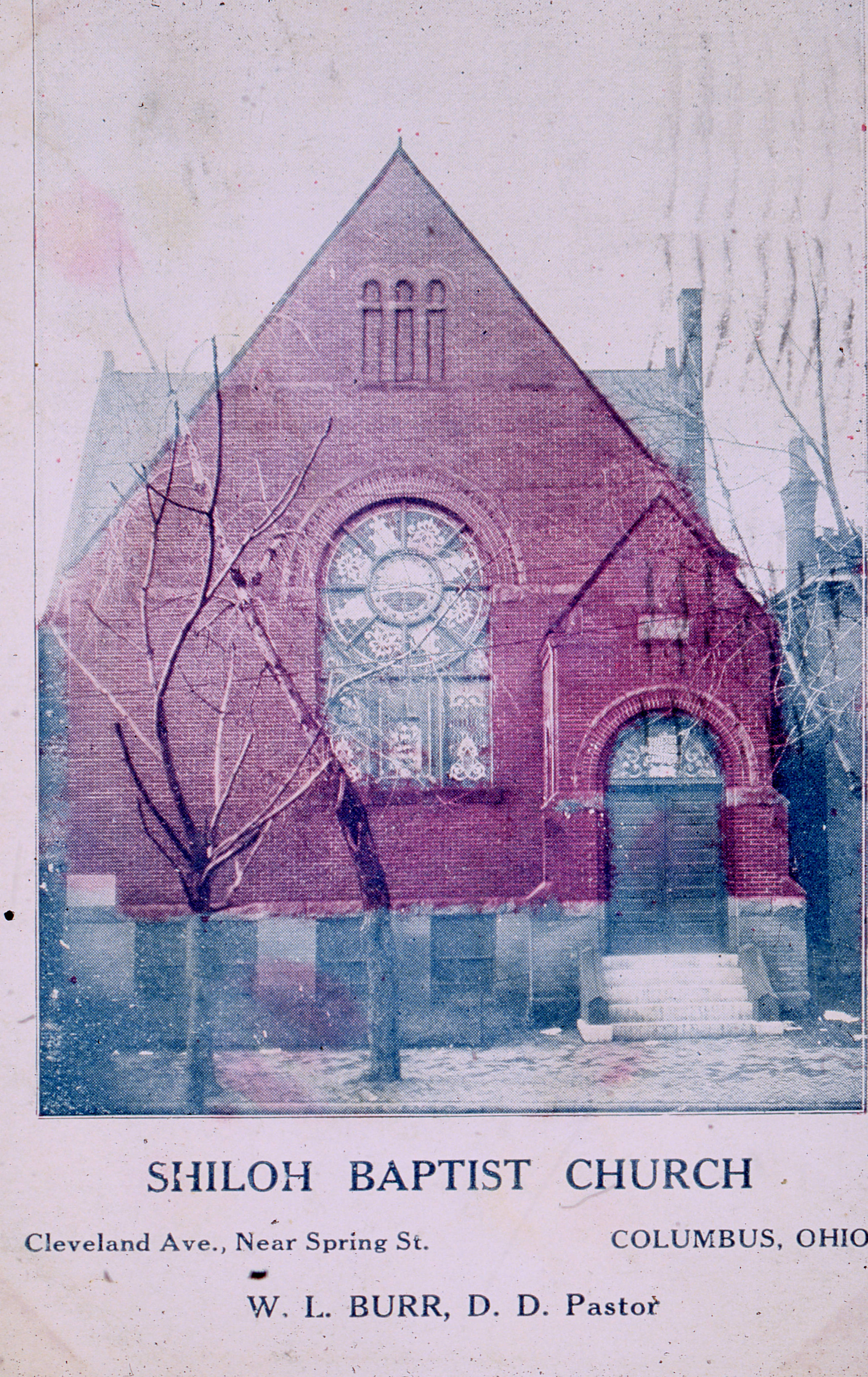
Prior home at 181 Cleveland Avenue, 1901

== See also ==
- National Register of Historic Places listings in Columbus, Ohio
