= Plaza Hotel (disambiguation) =

Plaza Hotel is a hotel in New York City.

Plaza Hotel may also refer to:

== Argentina ==
- Plaza Hotel Buenos Aires

== Cuba ==
- Plaza Hotel (Havana)

== Japan ==
- Keio Plaza Hotel

== Norway ==
- Radisson Blu Plaza Hotel (Oslo)

== South Korea ==
- The Plaza Hotel Seoul

== United States ==
- Hollywood Plaza Hotel, Los Angeles, California
- Plaza Hotel (San Juan Bautista, California), a California Historic Place in San Benito County, California
- Plaza Hotel (San Diego, California)
- Plaza Hotel (Colorado Springs, Colorado)
- Plaza Hotel (Jacksonville, Florida)
- Plaza Hotel (Trenton, Missouri)
- Plaza Hotel & Casino (Las Vegas, Nevada)
- Plaza Hotel (Las Vegas, New Mexico)
- Plaza Hotel (Columbus, Ohio), a National Register of Historic Places listing in Columbus, Ohio
- Plaza Hotel (Portland, Oregon), now known as Imperial Hotel
- Plaza Hotel, College Station, a hotel in Texas demolished in 2012
- Plaza Hotel (El Paso, Texas)
- Plaza Hotel (Thermopolis, Wyoming)

== See also ==
- Park Plaza (disambiguation)
