= Luszowice, Chrzanów County =

Luszowice
- Village
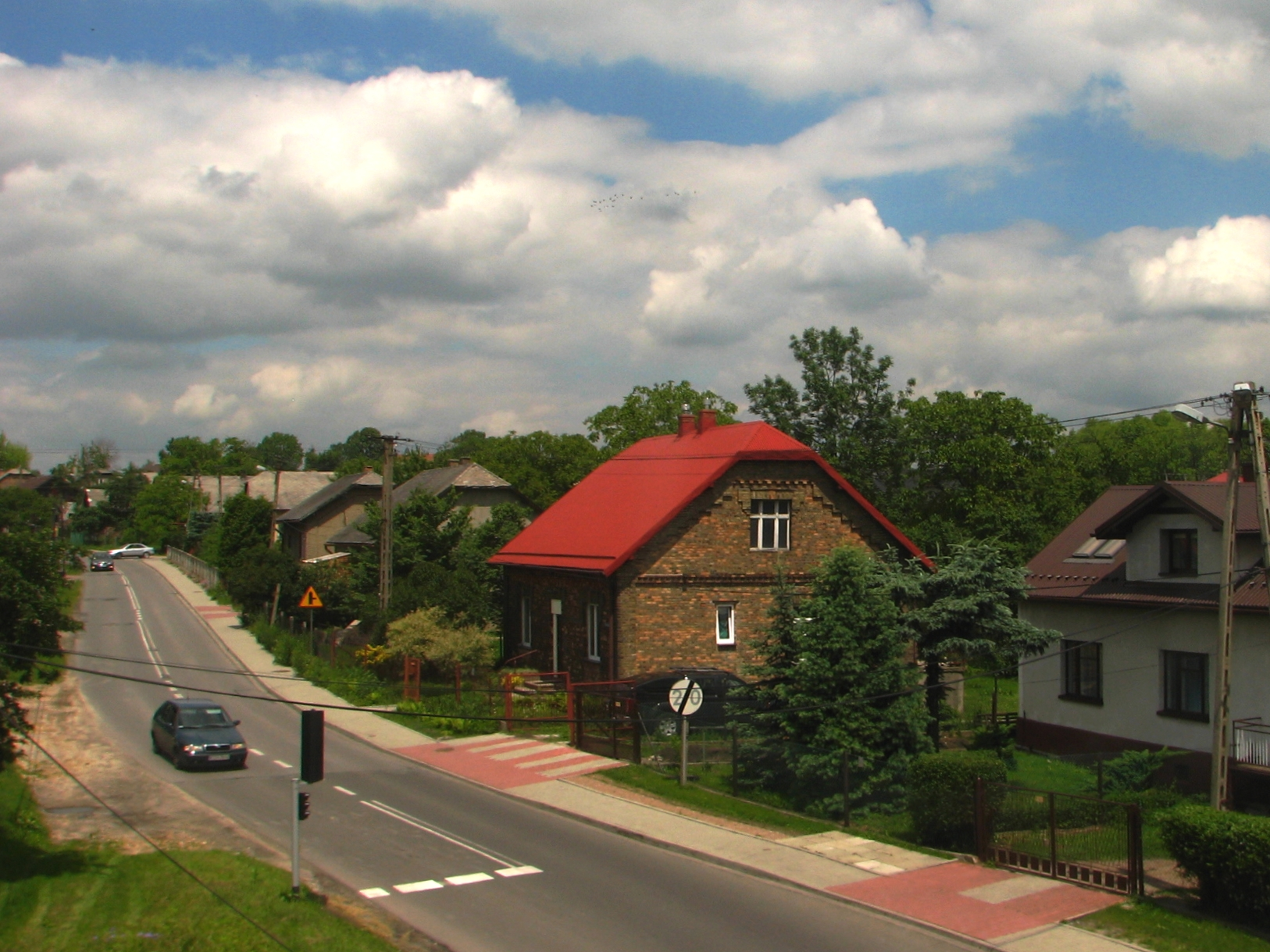

- Location within Poland
- Coordinates: 50°10′41″N 19°24′25″E
- Country: Poland
- Voivodeship: Lesser Poland
- County: Chrzanów
- Gmina: Chrzanów
- Population: 1,823

Luszowice [luʂɔˈvit͡sɛ] is a village in the administrative district of Gmina Chrzanów, within Chrzanów County, Lesser Poland Voivodeship, in southern Poland.
