= Poindexter Village =

Housing project in Columbus, Ohio

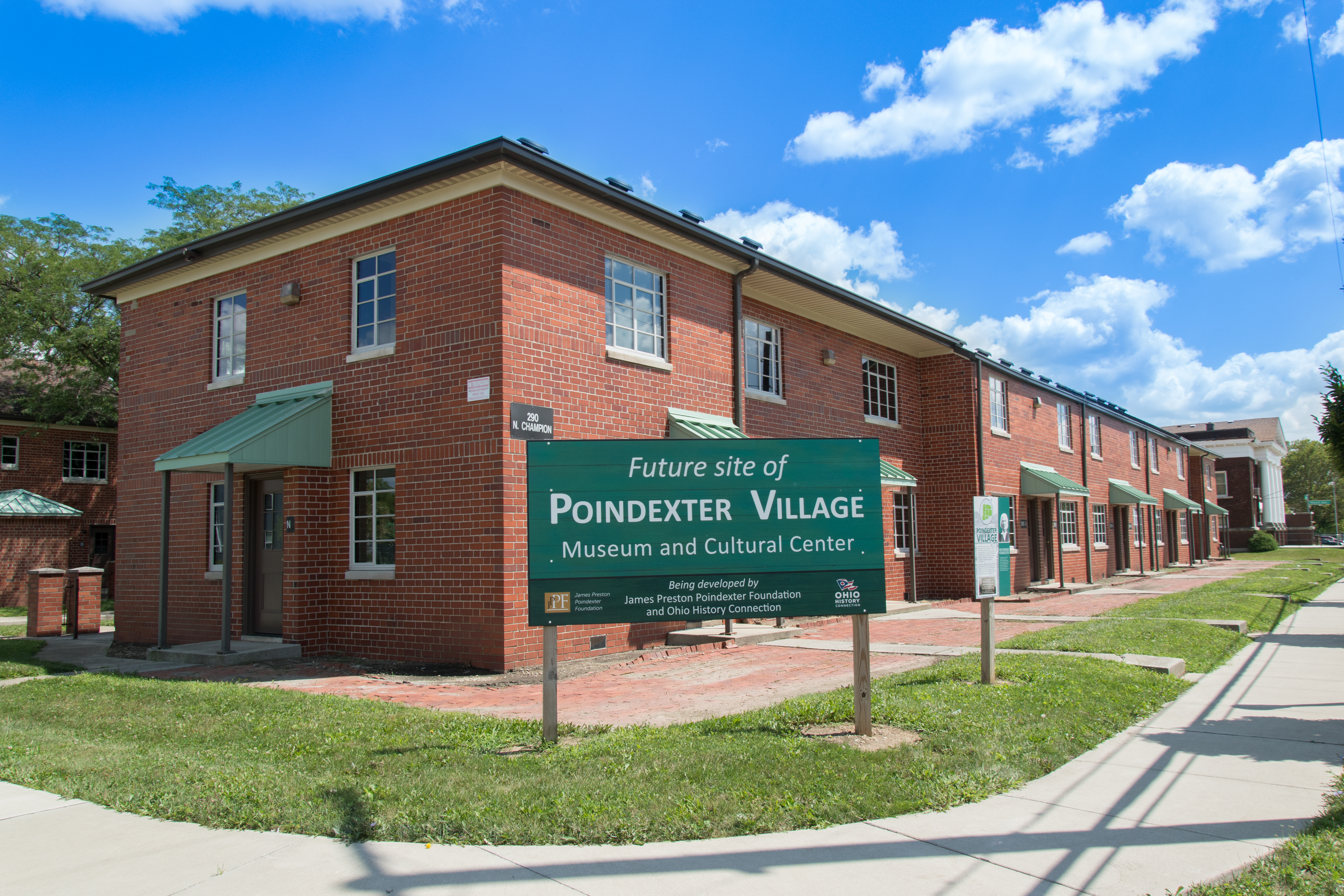
- One of two remaining buildings
- Interactive map of Poindexter Village

General information
- Location: 290 N. Champion Avenue, Columbus, Ohio
- Coordinates: 39.972060°N 82.967794°W
- Status: Partially demolished
- No. of units: 35

Construction
- Constructed: 1940

Listing
- Demolished: 2013 (partial)

Other information
- Governing body: Columbus Metropolitan Housing Authority

Poindexter Village was a historic public housing complex in the King-Lincoln Bronzeville neighborhood of Columbus, Ohio. Today, the remaining two buildings are set to become the Poindexter Village Museum and Cultural Center.

Poindexter Village was the first public housing project in Columbus, and one of the first in the United States. It was named for James Preston Poindexter, an abolitionist and Baptist minister who lived and practiced in the city.

== Attributes ==
Poindexter Village was established in the then-segregated East Side of Columbus. It was the first public housing in Columbus, and one of the first in the United States. The project provided stable and safe residences for African American families, allowing them to become successful. According to state senator Hearcel Craig, the project was essential to the success of Columbus as a whole.

Poindexter Village had a cost of $2,098 in 1940, and opened with about 400 units. It had 27 acres and 35 buildings. Noted Columbus architect Howard Dwight Smith was hired as consulting architect for the project. It was known as a hard-working and self-sufficient community, where neighbors took care of each other and set high standards for their careers - it became home to community leaders, doctors, educators, and artists.

The project was named for James Preston Poindexter, an abolitionist and Baptist minister who lived and practiced in the city. Poindexter was also the first Black person to serve on the city council in Columbus, and the first Black member of the city's board of education.

== History ==
The public housing project opened on October 12, 1940, where U.S. President Franklin D. Roosevelt visited to participate in the opening ceremony (Roosevelt had created many social programs, including the Federal Housing Administration). The project's early residents were all African Americans.

The housing project was successful in its first several decades, rising families out of poverty and allowing them to save to become homeowners. In later decades, drugs and crime affected the area, and vacancies grew, leading locals to call for Poindexter Village's demolition.

Around 2013, the Columbus Metropolitan Housing Authority demolished 33 of Poindexter Village's buildings, hoping to redevelop the site. A nine-year effort began, in order to save the remaining two buildings. The James Preston Poindexter Foundation was established in 2014 to tell the story of the housing project.

In 2016, the Columbus Landmarks Foundation included Poindexter Village in its list of most endangered sites in the city. Later that year, the Ohio History Connection voted to designate the property's two remaining buildings as a state historic site.

In 2017, the Ohio History Connection purchased these two remaining buildings, and the city gave $1 million toward their restoration and development into the Poindexter Village Museum and Cultural Center. The buildings were deteriorating and required stabilizing. Windows, doors, and porches were replaced with authentic replicas. The buildings' interiors will be renovated next, including gallery installation, with plans to complete the buildings by 2025. The museum will aim to educate on the housing project as well as famous African American residents of Columbus and the African American culture and history in the city.

The site was officially designated a state historic site in July 2021.

== See also ==
- Hanford Village George Washington Carver Addition Historic District
- List of museums in Columbus, Ohio
