= Plaza Apartments =

Plaza Apartments may refer to:

- Plaza Apartments (Hot Springs, Arkansas), listed on the NRHP in Arkansas
- Plaza Apartments (Cleveland, Ohio), listed on the NRHP in Ohio
- Plaza Apartments (Philadelphia, Pennsylvania), listed on the NRHP in Pennsylvania
