= Pogorzyce =

- Village
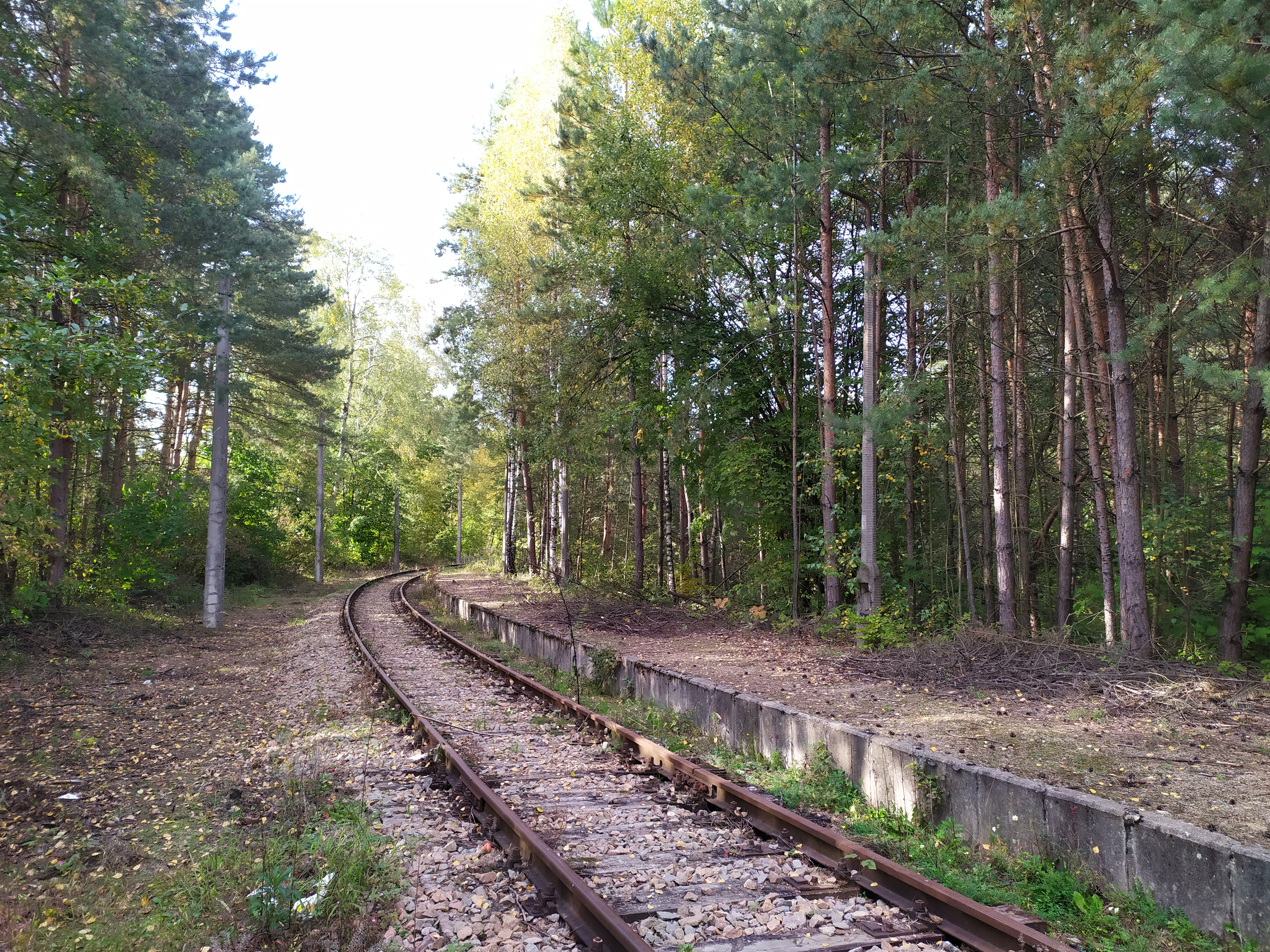
- Train stop

- Location within Poland
- Coordinates: 50°6′N 19°25′E
- Country: Poland
- Voivodeship: Lesser Poland
- County: Chrzanów
- Gmina: Chrzanów
- Population: 1,400

Pogorzyce [pɔɡɔˈʐɨt͡sɛ] is a village in the administrative district of Gmina Chrzanów, within Chrzanów County, Lesser Poland Voivodeship, in southern Poland.
