= St. Clair Hospital =

- U.S. National Register of Historic Places
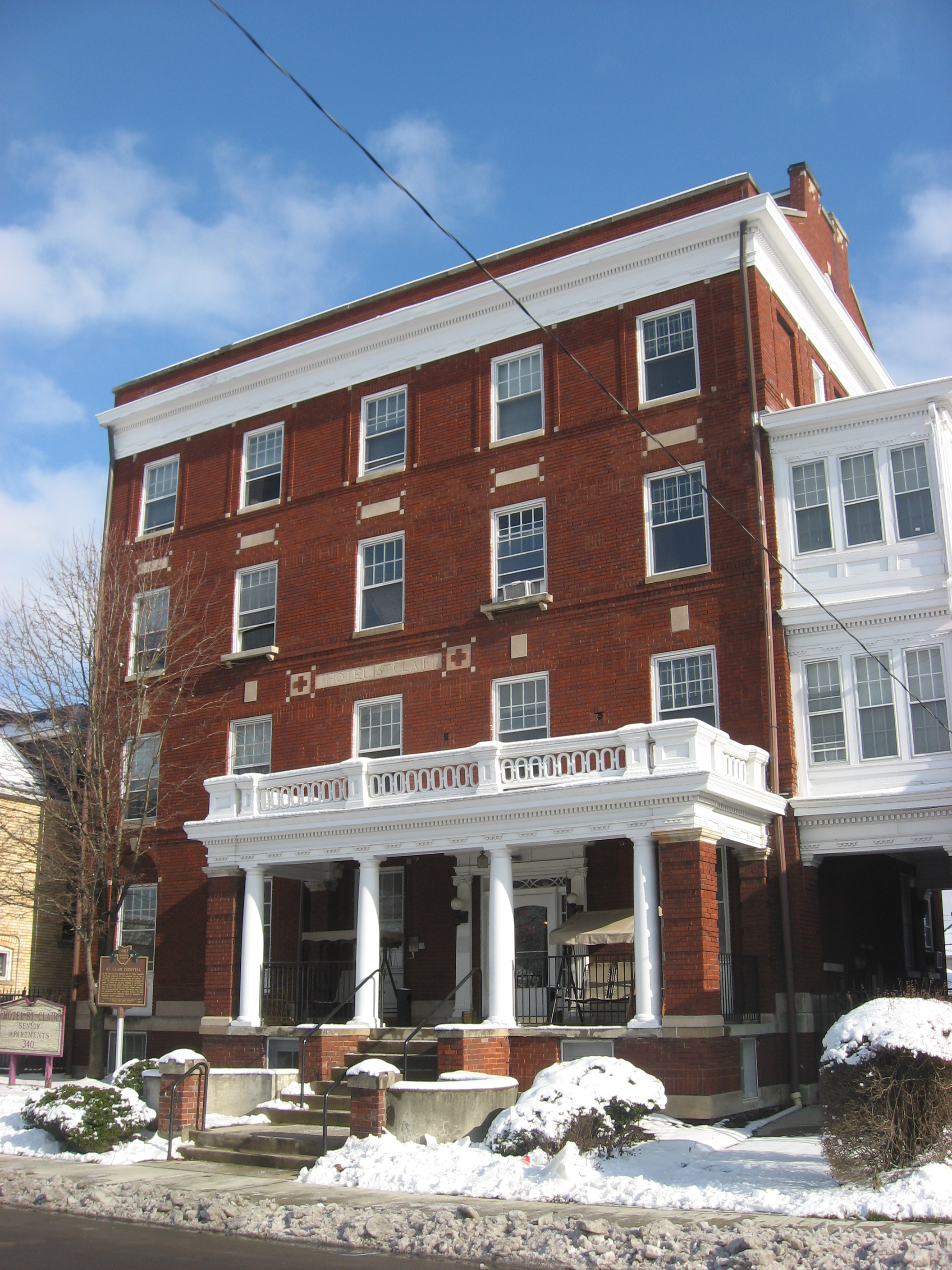
- Interactive map highlighting the building's location
- Location: 338-344 and 346 St. Clair Ave., Columbus, Ohio
- Coordinates: 39.971712°N 82.980625°W
- Built: 1911
- NRHP reference No.: 01000378
- Added to NRHP: April 12, 2001

The St. Clair Hospital is a historic building in the King-Lincoln Bronzeville neighborhood of Columbus, Ohio. It was listed on the National Register of Historic Places in 2001. The building was commissioned as a general hospital, built in 1911, and operated until 1940. It subsequently served as a convalescent home from 1940 to 1946. The building became a hotel, known as the Hotel St. Clair in 1948, operating until 1976. In the early 2000s, the building was renovated for senior citizen housing. In 2017, the building was run down and vacant. It was sold to a local developer who renovated it into market rate apartments. The building currently has 32 apartment units for rent, a tenant lounge, and a laundry room.

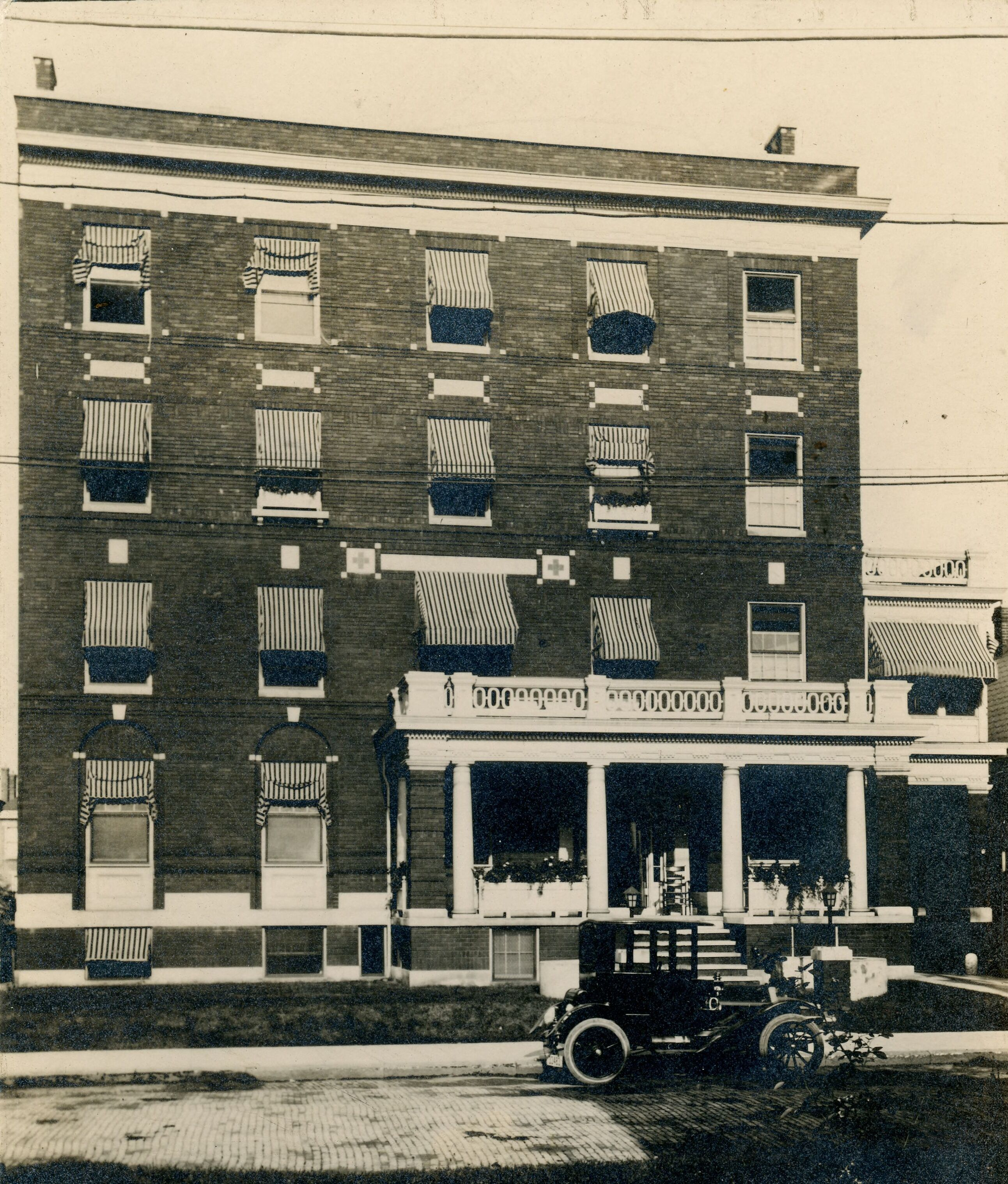
The St. Clair Hospital in Columbus, Ohio, seen ca. 1911

The building is one of eight surviving sites listed in The Green Book in Columbus.

== See also ==
- National Register of Historic Places listings in Columbus, Ohio
