= Gmina Chrzanów, Lesser Poland Voivodeship =

Gmina Chrzanów Chrzanów Commune
- Gmina
- Coat of arms
- Interactive map of Gmina Chrzanów
- Coordinates (Chrzanów): 50°8′N 19°24′E
- Country: Poland
- Voivodeship: Lesser Poland
- County: Chrzanów
- Seat: Chrzanów

Area
  - Total: 79.33 km^{2} (30.63 sq mi)

Population (2007)
  - Total: 49,616
  - Density: 625.4/km^{2} (1,620/sq mi)
  - Urban: 39,594
  - Rural: 10,022
- Website: http://www.chrzanow.pl/

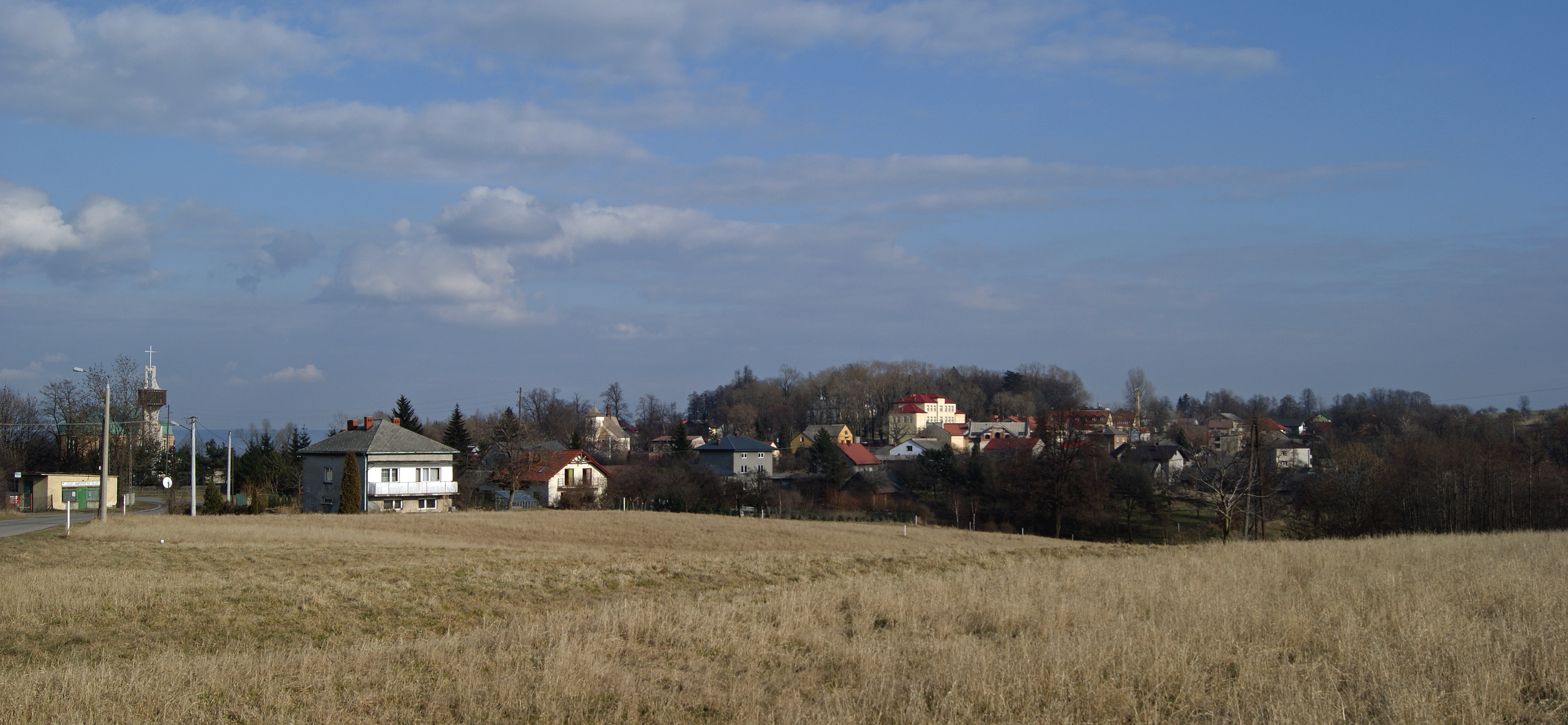
Płaza village (view from SW), Chrzanów County, Lesser Poland Voivodeship, Poland

Gmina Chrzanów is an urban-rural gmina (administrative district) in Chrzanów County, Lesser Poland Voivodeship, in southern Poland. Its seat is the town of Chrzanów, which lies approximately 40 kilometres (25 mi) west of the regional capital Kraków.

== Overview ==
The gmina covers an area of 79.33 square kilometres (30.6 sq mi), and as of 2007 its total population is 49,616 (out of which the population of Chrzanów amounts to 39,594, and the population of the rural part of the gmina is 10,022).

The gmina contains part of the protected area called Tenczynek Landscape Park.

== Villages ==
Apart from the town of Chrzanów, Gmina Chrzanów contains the villages and settlements of Balin, Luszowice, Płaza and Pogorzyce.

== Neighbouring gminas ==
Gmina Chrzanów is bordered by the city of Jaworzno and by the gminas of Alwernia, Babice, Libiąż and Trzebinia.
