= The Plaza =

The Plaza may refer to:

== United States ==
- The Plaza (Orange, California), a commercial and economic area
- Riverside Plaza (Riverside, California) or The Plaza, a shopping mall
- Plaza on Brickell, in Miami, Florida
- The Plaza Live, a theater in Orlando, Florida
- Riverside Plaza (Chicago) or The Plaza, an Art Deco building in Illinois
- The Plaza (mall), in Evergreen Park near Chicago, Illinois
- The Plaza (Indianapolis, Indiana) an apartment building
- Riverside Plaza or The Plaza, an apartment complex in Minneapolis, Minnesota
- Plaza Hotel & Casino, in Las Vegas, Nevada
- The Plaza at Harmon Meadow, a shopping complex in Secaucus, New Jersey
- Plaza Hotel (Las Vegas, New Mexico)
- Plaza Hotel, in New York City
- The Plaza Suite, a defunct discothèque that was in Brooklyn, New York City
- The Plaza (Salisbury, North Carolina), a multi-use building
- Plaza Hotel (El Paso, Texas)
- The Plaza (Spokane), Spokane, Washington
- The Plaza (Charlotte), a street in Charlotte, North Carolina
- Country Club Plaza, in Kansas City, Missouri
- Bank of America Plaza (Atlanta), Georgia

== Other countries ==
- The Plaza, Liverpool, England
- The Plaza Semanggi (now Lippo Mall Nusantara), a commercial complex in South Jakarta, Indonesia
- The Plaza Shopping Centre, in Palmerston North, New Zealand
- The Plaza (Singapore), a high-rise commercial and residential building
- The Plaza Hotel Seoul, a luxury hotel in Seoul, South Korea
  - Not to be confused with the Seoul Plaza

== Other uses ==
- Plaza Accord

== See also ==
- La Plaza (disambiguation)
- Plaza (disambiguation)
