= Plaza Building =

Plaza Building may refer to:

- Plaza Building (Patterson, California), listed on the National Register of Historic Places listings in Stanislaus County, California
- Plaza Building (Des Moines, Iowa)
- The Plaza (Salisbury, North Carolina)

== See also ==
- Plaza (disambiguation)
