= Balin, Lesser Poland Voivodeship =

Balin
- Village
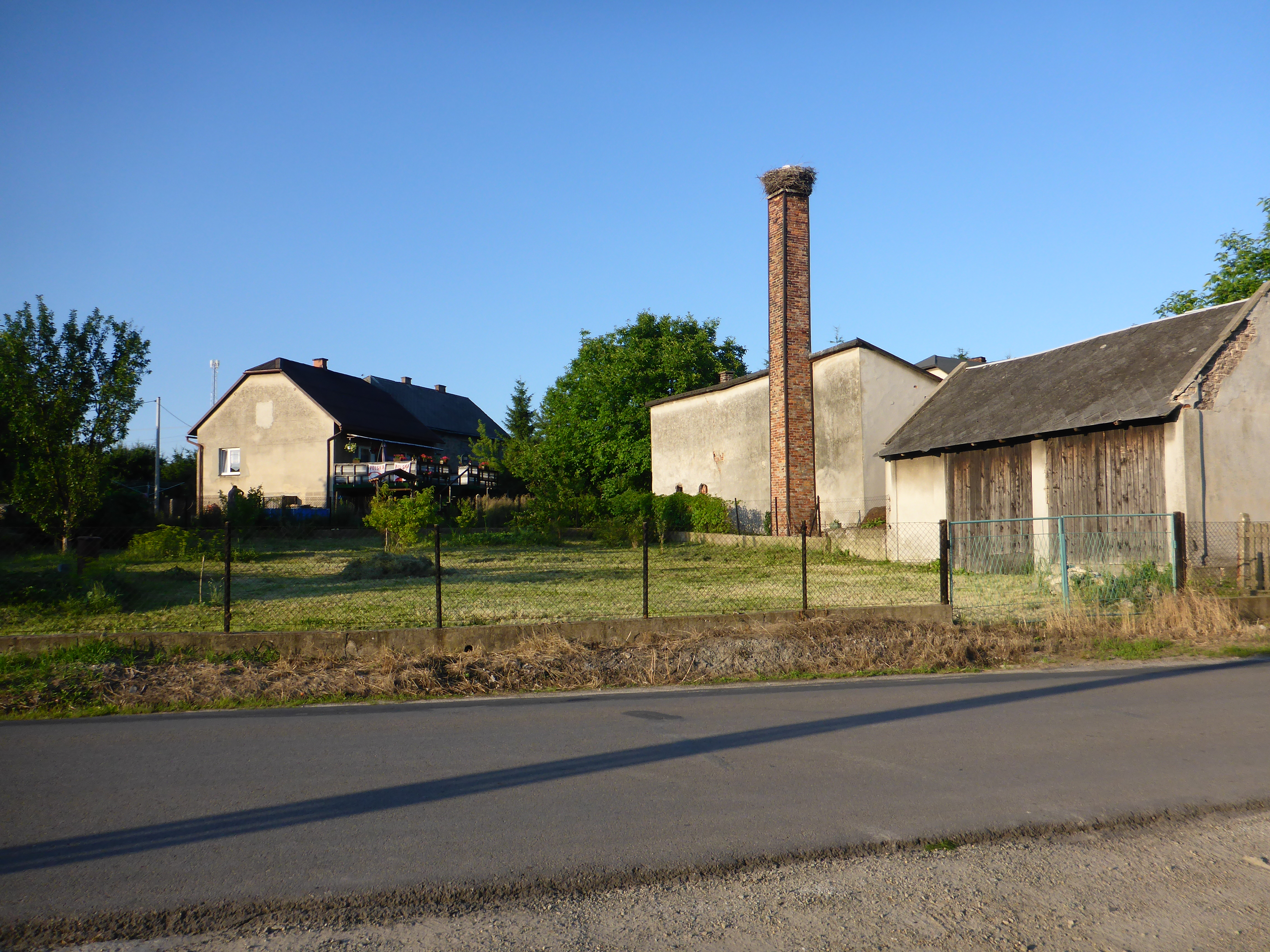

- Location within Poland
- Coordinates: 50°9′56″N 19°23′24″E
- Country: Poland
- Voivodeship: Lesser Poland
- County: Chrzanów
- Gmina: Chrzanów
- Population: 3,400

Balin [ˈbalin] is a village in the administrative district of Gmina Chrzanów, within Chrzanów County, Lesser Poland Voivodeship, in southern Poland.
