= Second Baptist Church (Columbus, Ohio) =

Baptist Church in Ohio, US

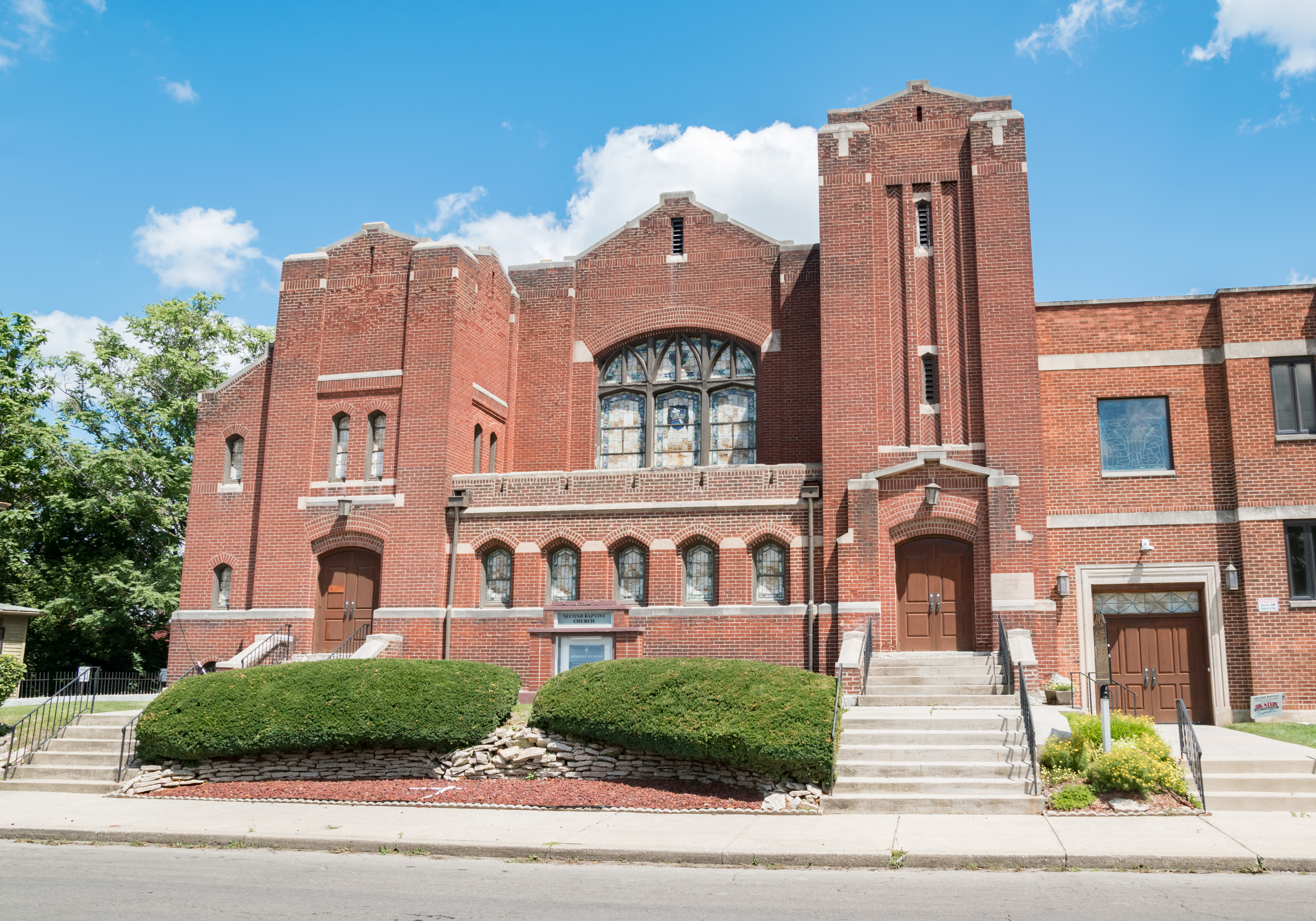
- Second Baptist Church
- 39.968856°N 82.976725°W
- Address: 186 N. 17th St, Columbus, Ohio
- Country: United States
- Denomination: Baptist
- Website: www.secondbaptistcolumbus.com

Architecture
- Years built: 1907–1908

Second Baptist Church is a Baptist church in the King-Lincoln Bronzeville neighborhood of Columbus, Ohio. The church has the oldest African-American Baptist congregation in Columbus. It has been recognized as a historic underground railroad site by The Friends of Freedom Society and the Ohio Underground Railroad Association.

== History ==
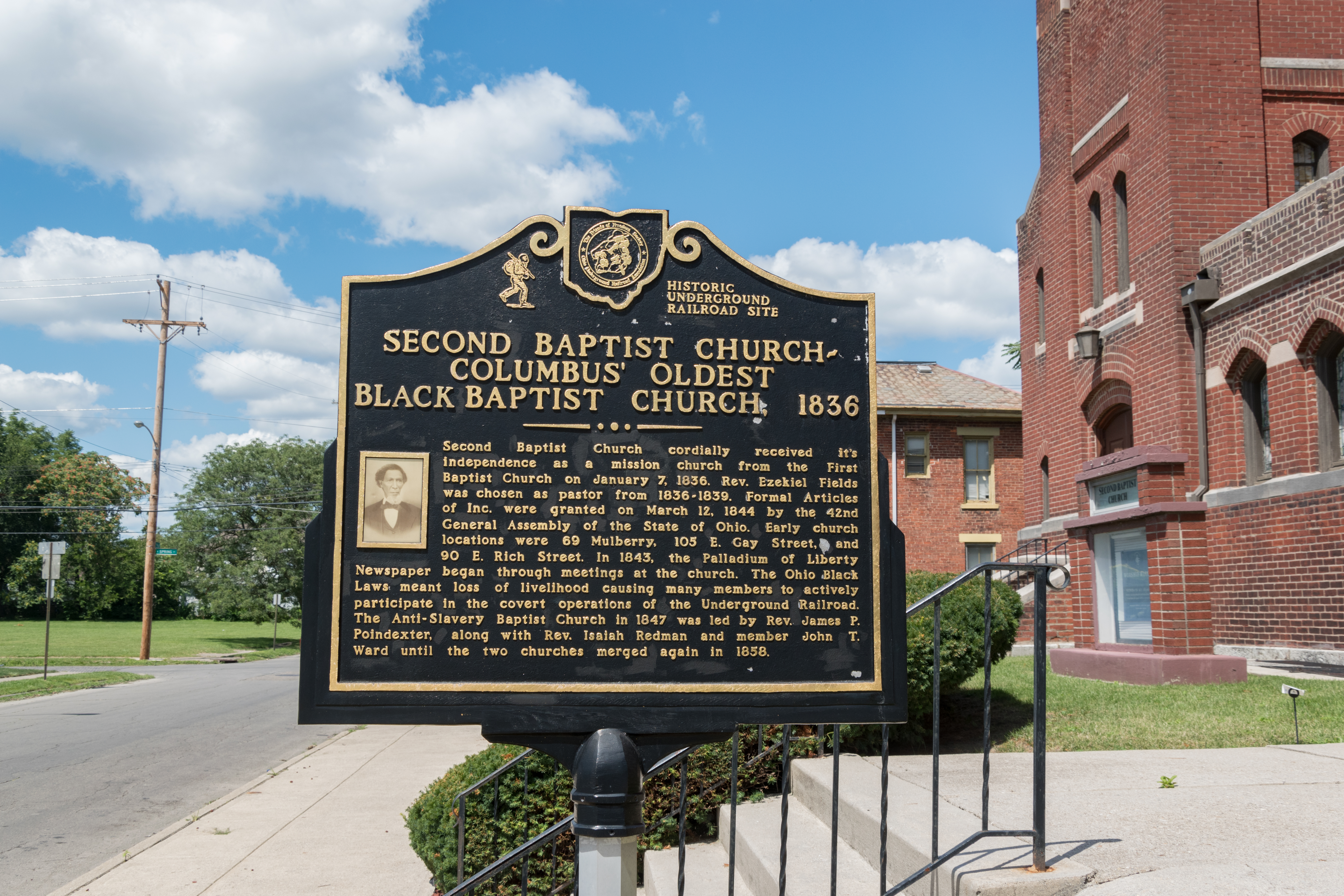
Historical marker outside the church

It was founded in 1836 and headed by Reverend Ezekiel Fields who made the initial request to First Baptist Church to start a mission church. Fields' would serve as pastor until 1839. Pleasant Litchford, a blacksmith who was formerly enslaved in Virginia, was the church's founding deacon. In 1844, the church was charted by the state of Ohio as a non-profit organization. In 1847, a faction of the church split off due to dissenting opinions regarding a Black family that had joined the congregation and who had previously owned slaves. The family was urged to use the proceeded from selling their slaves to buy them out of slavery but they had refused. The dissenting faction was known as The Anti-Slavery Baptist Church and was led by Reverend James Preston Poindexter. The Anti-Slavery Baptist Church reunited with the church in 1858 with Pointdexter appointed to lead the combined church as its pastor. Pointdexter would serve as the Pastor of the Second Baptist Church from 1858 to 1898 and continued preaching abolitionism from the pulpit.

The current church building was constructed from 1907 to 1908, dedicated on January 26, 1908.

From 1936 to 1970, Reverend Charles Frank Jenkins served as Pastor. Rev. Jenkins was succeeded by Reverend Harold E. Pinkston who served from August 1971 to 1975. Even though Pinkston seemingly left his pastoral position in 1975, the Columbus Call and Post - a local African American newspaper - reports that he had been ousted from the pulpit by a majority vote from the church membership on December 7, 1975. The oust of Pinkston was contested before the Common Pleas Court and Judge Fred Shoemaker ruled the dispute must be settled by another election, which was to be conducted on January 17, 1976. Reverend Leon Troy was approached to be the church's pastor in May 1976 and began his pastoral duties August 15, 1976 until his first retirement in August 1996. The church's congregation grew nearly five times under his leadership from 250 to 1200. Troy was awarded the Poindexter award by Columbus City Council in 2019 for his contributions to the faith community. In 1996, Reverend Yvette W. Hensley becomes the first female minister ordained by Second Baptist Church. Rev. Troy returned to Second Baptist Church as a "Spiritual Overseer" after the departure of Reverend David S.Carter, who served as pastor from February 1999 to 2004. Reverend Howard T. Washington has served as the church's pastor since 2006.

== Service ==
The church has provided a wide range of services to its community. The church established a 45 unit senior citizen housing complex known as Chandler Arms. It helped provide citywide food assistance via programs like "Operation Potato." The church also partnered with Neighborhood House to provide food and clothing to families in need. Additionally, the church enhanced its own capacity through its creation of a pre-school center and a $1 million education wing.

== Location ==
The Second Baptist Church is located in the King-Lincoln Bronzeville neighborhood at 186 N. 17th St, Columbus, Ohio. It had previously been located at three different addresses: 69 Mulberry Street, 105 East Gay Street, and 90 East Rich Street.
