= James Preston Poindexter =

American abolitionist, civil rights activist, politician & Baptist minister (1819-1907)

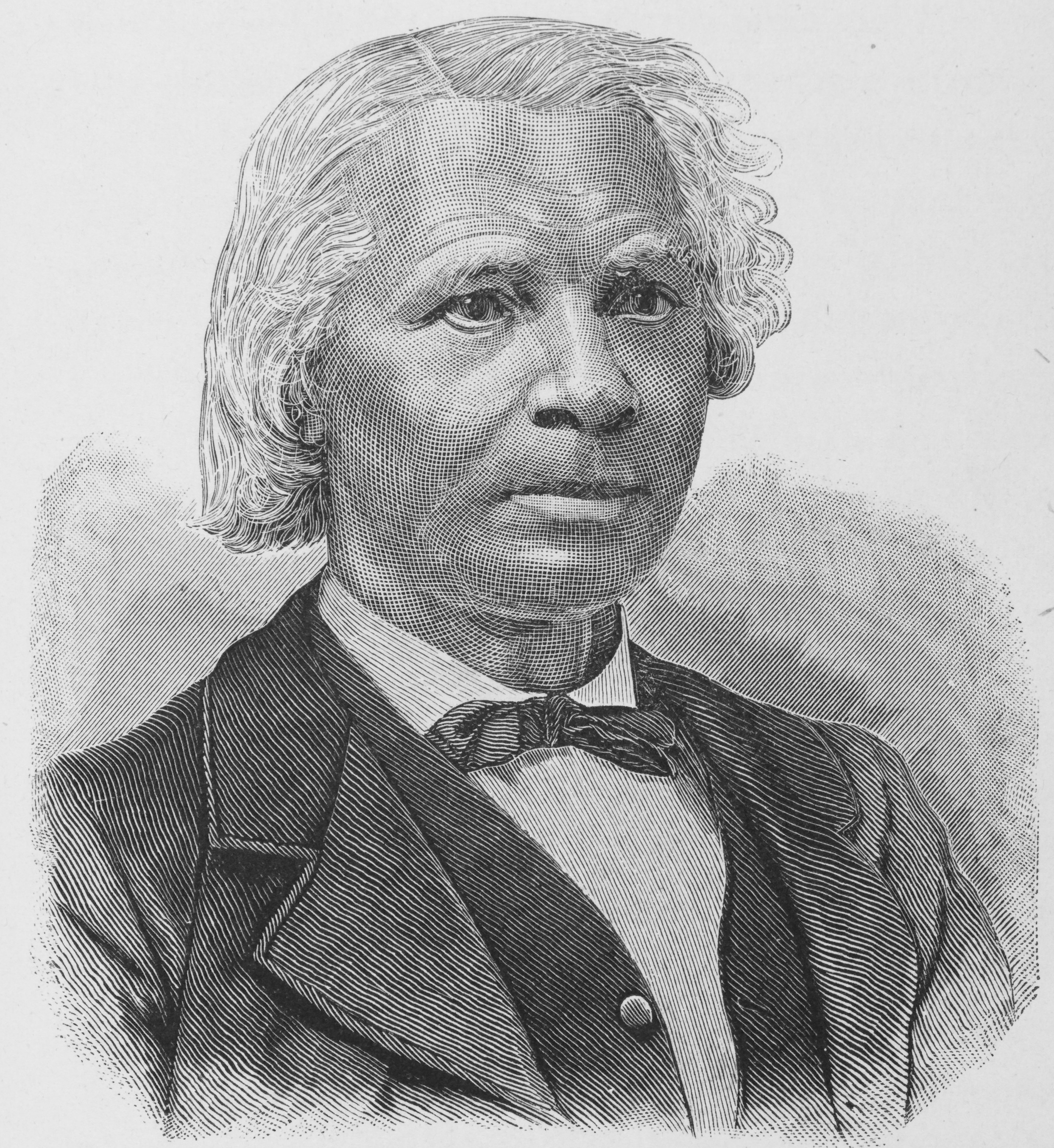
- Poindexter in 1887
- Born: October 26, 1819; Richmond, Virginia, U.S.
- Died: February 7, 1907 (aged 87); Columbus, Ohio, U.S.
- Occupation: Minister
- Political party: Free Soil Party; Republican

Religious life
- Religion: Baptist

James Preston Poindexter (October 26, 1819 – February 7, 1907) was an abolitionist, civil rights activist, politician, and Baptist minister from Columbus, Ohio. He was born in Richmond, Virginia and moved to Ohio as a young man. In Ohio he was a part of abolitionist and Underground Railroad societies and became a Baptist preacher. From the pulpit, he preached against slavery and for African-American rights. After the American Civil War (1861–1865), he was involved in political activities in Columbus, serving on the City Council, the city Board of Education, the state Forestry Bureau, and as trustee of the Institute for the Blind and of Wilberforce University. At his death, he was noted as the second longest serving advocate for African American rights after Booker T. Washington.

== Biography ==
=== Early life ===
James Preston Poindexter was born in Richmond, Virginia October 26, 1819 to Evelina and Joseph Poindexter. His mother was black and Cherokee. Joseph was a white man and may have been a brother of George Poindexter, second governor of Mississippi. Joseph was a journalist at the Richmond Enquirer. His mother died when he was four years old. As a child, he attended school, and at the age ten, he was apprenticed to the barber's business. He worked in an aristocratic shop, and Poindexter became acquainted with many Richmond leaders. He later moved to Ohio, settling in Columbus at the age of twelve. In Ohio, he continued to attend school, now privately, and to work as a barber, which again afforded him a variety of useful contacts. In the 1840s he married. After giving the baccalaureate sermon before the graduating class of the State University, Louisville, Kentucky in May, 1887, he was granted an honorary Doctor of Divinity by the school.

=== Early career ===
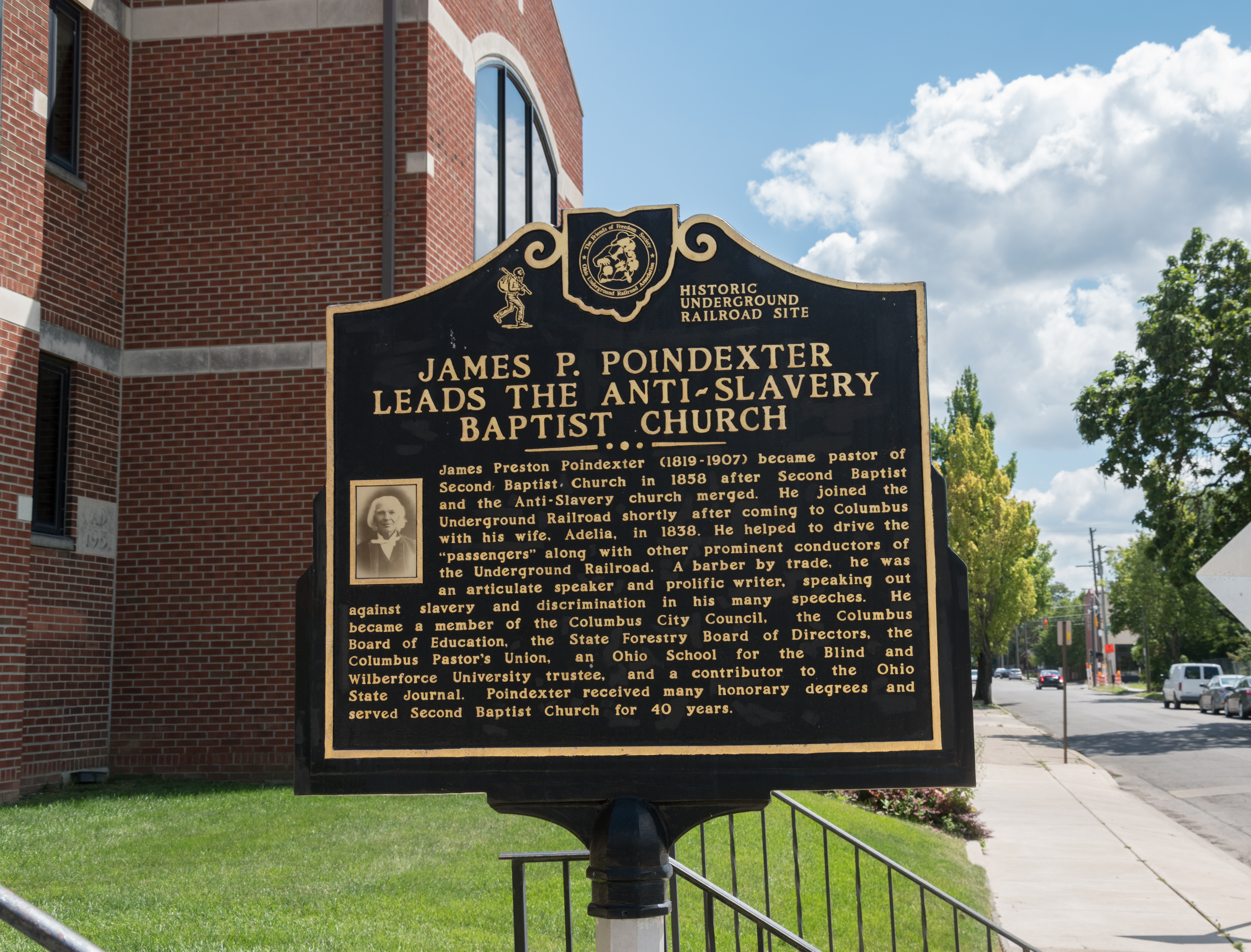
Poindexter is featured on a historical memorial in front of the Second Baptist Church in Columbus, Ohio

Poindexter was baptized at the Second Baptist Church in Columbus in the spring of 1840, was ordained in 1849, and became pastor of the Second Baptist Church in 1862, serving until 1893. He was a member of the Pastor's Union and later elected president of the union.

He frequently preached against slavery, working against the trend of many preachers failing to respond to claims that the Bible sanctioned slavery. In about 1857 he became president of the society called, "sons of protection," a position he held for 30 years, a secretive African-American civil rights group associated with the Underground Railroad. Other African-American active abolitionists in Columbus included David Jenkins, John Booker, Leslie Washington Sr, and John T. Ward and where helped by white abolitionists including Joseph Sullivant, James E. Coulter, L. G. Van Slyke, Samuel H. Smith, James M. Westwater, the Keltons, William Hanby, Phillip Doddridge, and Eli M. Pinney. In December 1848, Poindexter played an important role in bringing Frederick Douglass to Columbus to speak at a Free Soil Party Convention.

=== Later career ===
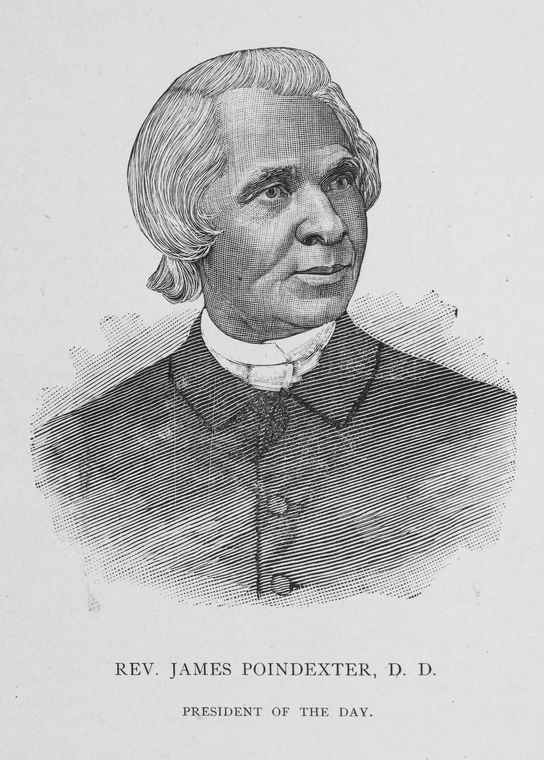
Poindexter in 1888

After the Civil War, Poindexter was a leading advocate for education of black children. He was a delegate to the 1872 Republican National Convention in Philadelphia and was a delegate to state conventions many times. In 1873, he was the first black man in Ohio nominated to run for a seat in the House of Representatives. He was nominated by the Republican Party, but was defeated by the overwhelmingly Democratic electorate in Franklin County.

Starting in 1880, he served two terms, four years, as a member of the city council of Columbus, serving as council vice-president. He was also appointed to fill a vacancy in the Board of Education and later elected to the position, from 1884 to 1893. He was appointed to a four-year term as trustee of the Institute for the Blind by Ohio Governor Charles Foster. He was also appointed trustee of the Athens University (now Ohio University) by Governor George Hoadly but was rejected by the state senate for political reasons in 1885. In 1887 he was appointed to a six-year term as a member of the Board of Directors of the Ohio State Forestry Bureau and was reappointed twice more. In September 1888, he served as president of the Columbus Centennial Freedom Jubillee. He was appointed as a trustee for Wilberforce University in 1898 by governor Asa Bushnell. He served as the first black foreman of an Ohio grand Jury. He was a frequent contributor to numerous newspapers and journals and worked closely with Presidents Rutherford B. Hayes and William McKinley and Ohio governor William Dennison Jr.

=== Death and legacy ===
In 1898 he resigned as pastor of the Second Baptist Church, although he continued to preach. He died in Columbus on February 7, 1907, of pneumonia and was survived by two grandchildren. The first public housing project built in Columbus, Poindexter Village, was named for him.
