= Plaza Hotel (Columbus, Ohio) =

- U.S. National Register of Historic Places
- The Plaza Hotel in 1984
- Interactive map pinpointing the site of the building
- Location: 736-740 E. Long St., Columbus, Ohio
- Coordinates: 39.967502°N 82.981399°W
- Built: c. 1895
- Architectural style: Italianate
- NRHP reference No.: 84001041
- Added to NRHP: December 20, 1984

The Plaza Hotel was a building in the King-Lincoln Bronzeville neighborhood of Columbus, Ohio. It was built c. 1895 and was listed on the National Register of Historic Places in 1984.

The building was built in a commercial Italianate style, with a brick exterior and three stories. The building was seven bays wide and eleven deep. The hotel faced Long St., with a distinctive facade including carved stone lintels on its upper-floor windows and a decorative metal cornice with a central gable. At the time the building was nominated for the National Register, it was one of few in the area retaining characteristics of the late 19th century.

The building originally held apartments on its upper floors, but it was converted to hotel use in 1929. The hotel was open to African Americans who were not welcome in many hotels in Columbus. It also attracted those who frequented the many clubs in the area, including nationally known musicians. In the mid-to-late 20th century, highway construction and deterioration damaged the neighborhood. By 1984, the building was vacant.

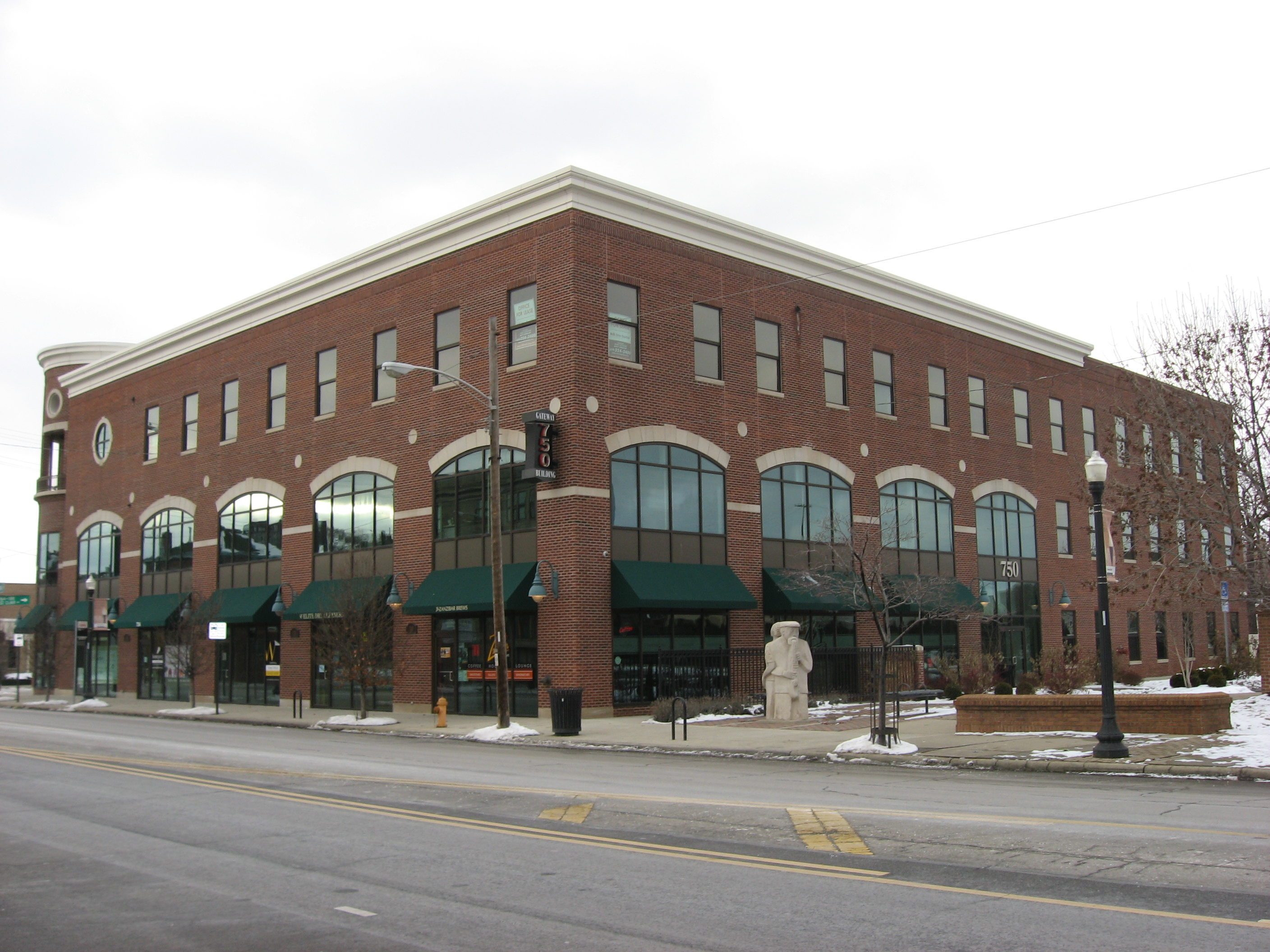
Building now at the site

== See also ==
- National Register of Historic Places listings in Columbus, Ohio
