= Plaza Apartments (Hot Springs, Arkansas) =

- U.S. National Register of Historic Places
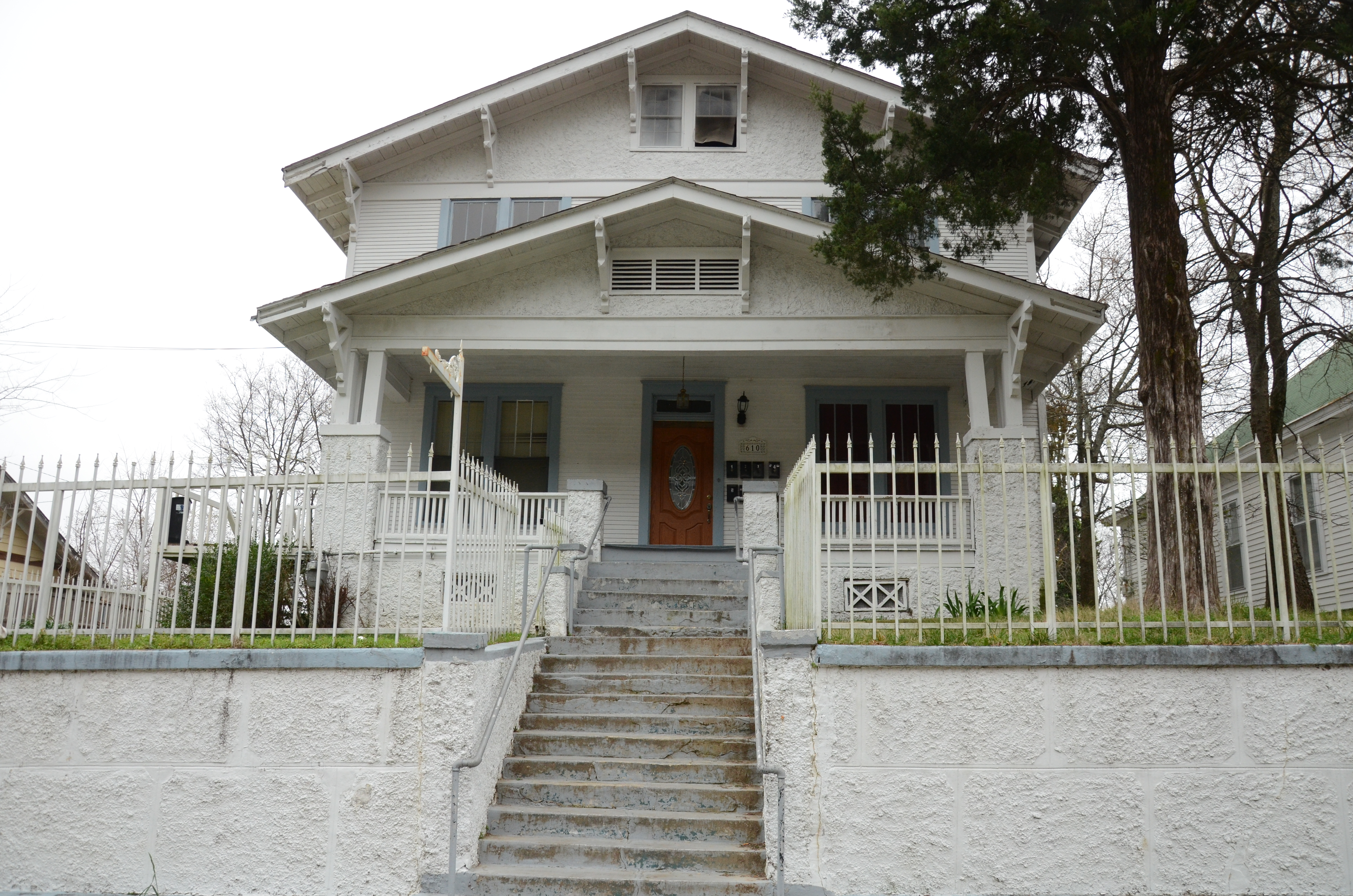
- Plaza Apartments in 2016

- Location within Arkansas Location within the United States
- Nearest city: 610 Spring St., Hot Springs, Arkansas
- Coordinates: 34°30′45″N 93°2′52″W
- Area: less than one acre
- Built: 1915
- Architectural style: Bungalow/craftsman
- NRHP reference No.: 99001259
- Added to NRHP: November 5, 1999

The Plaza Apartments are a historic residential building at 610 Spring Street in Hot Springs, Arkansas. It is a two-story wood-frame structure, with a front-facing gable roof, stuccoed exterior, and a single-story gabled front porch. The stucco has been painted to resemble stone blocks. The roof eaves are decorated with large Craftsman style brackets. The building was constructed about 1915 as a rooming house, and is a good local example of Craftsman styling. The building's interior has also retained significant period woodwork, including trim, doors, and stairs.

The building was listed on the National Register of Historic Places in 1999.

== See also ==
- National Register of Historic Places listings in Garland County, Arkansas
