= La Plaza Cultural de Armando Perez =

Community garden in New York City

Coordinates: 40°43′31″N 73°58′43″W

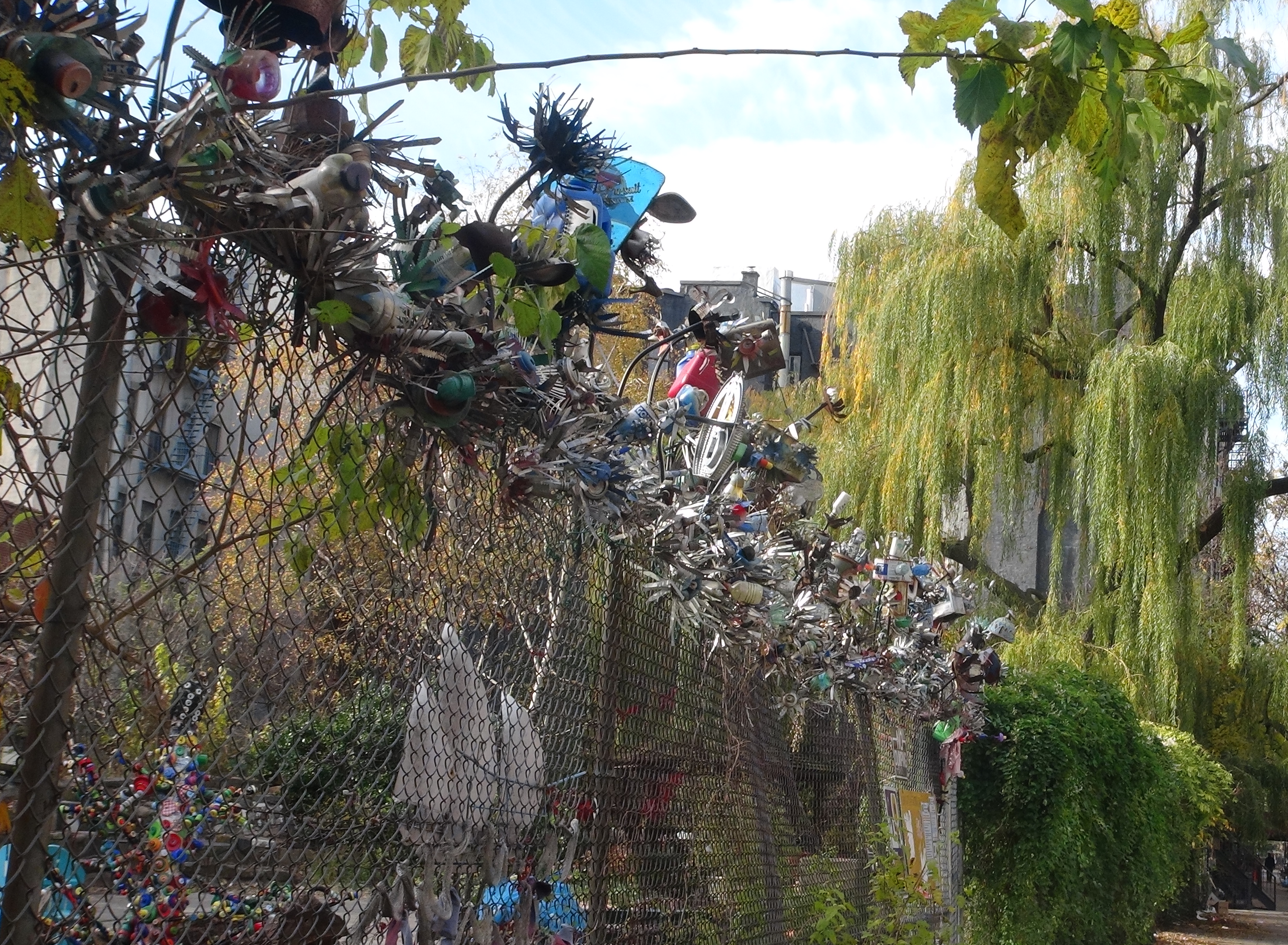
East 9th street view of La Plaza Cultural

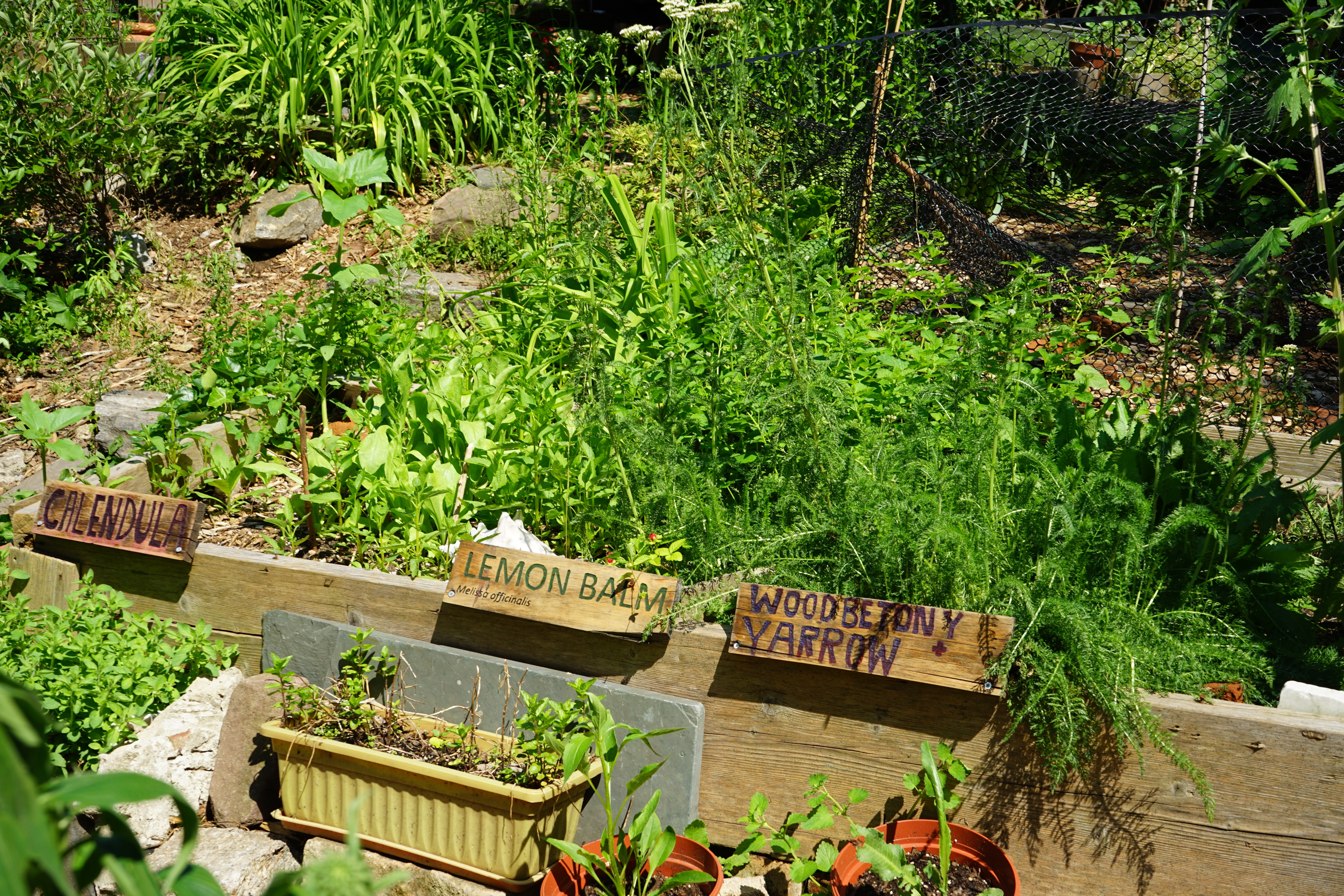
Calendula, Lemon Balm, Wood Betony, and Yarrow plants currently growing in the medicinal garden of La Plaza Cultural.

La Plaza Cultural de Armando Perez (also known as La Plaza Cultural) is a community garden and public green space in the East Village neighborhood of Manhattan, New York City. Serving as a community garden, park, playground, wildlife refuge, urban farm, community composting site, and performance venue, La Plaza Cultural is also utilized by local day-care centers, after-school programs and a growing number of parents with small children. The garden has been known to grow a number of various edible plants including fruits, vegetable, and herbs. The lot is approximately 0.64 acres and consists of at least 11 members.

== History ==
La Plaza Cultural was founded in 1976 by local residents and greening activists who took over what was then a series of vacant city lots piled high with rubble and trash. In an effort to improve the neighborhood during a downward trend of arson, drugs, and abandonment caused by the New York City fiscal crisis of the late 1970s, members of the Latino group Charas/El Bohio cleared out truckloads of refuse. Working with Buckminster Fuller, they built a geodesic dome in the open “plaza” and began staging cultural events. Green Guerilla's pioneer, Liz Christy, seeded the turf with “seed bombs” and planted towering weeping willows and linden trees. Artist Gordon Matta-Clark helped construct La Plaza’s amphitheater using railroad ties and materials reclaimed from abandoned buildings. Later, block residents tilled the western portion of the space and planted vegetables, flowers, and fruit trees. During the 1980s, the garden came under attack by developers seeking to build on the space. After numerous court battles, La Plaza was finally preserved in 2002 as part of the terms of a legal settlement. In 2003, La Plaza was renamed in memory of Armando Perez, a CHARAS founder and former District Leader of the Lower East Side, who was killed in 1999.

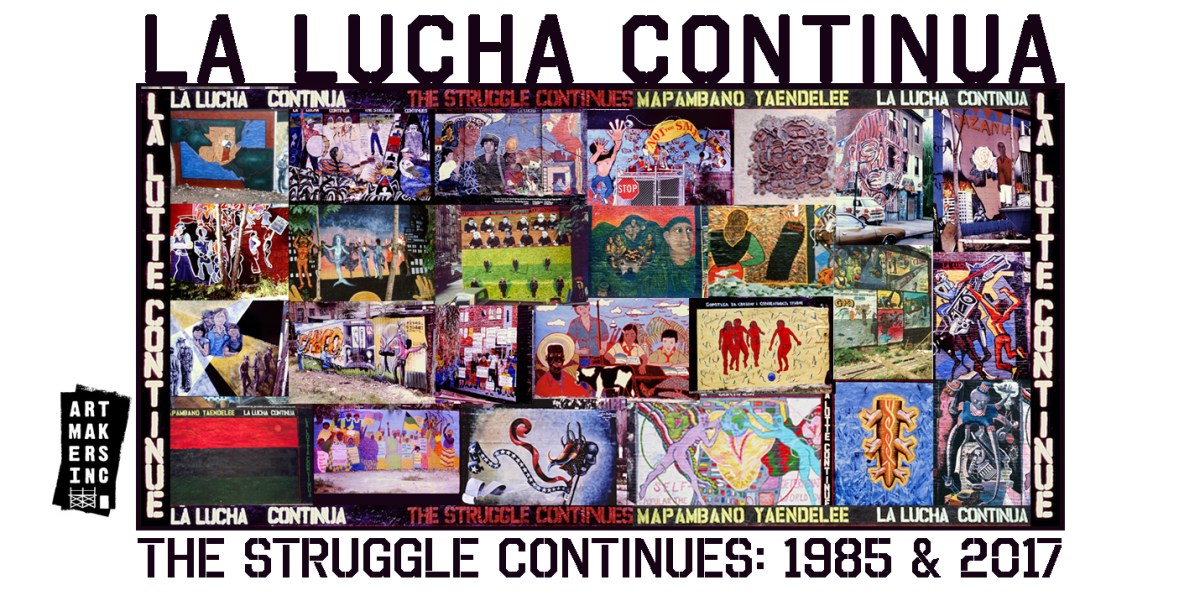
Exhibit flyer celebrating the La Lucha Continua Murals at La Plaza Cultural community garden.

In 1985, Artmakers Inc., organized a meeting calling for "artists of conviction to paint political murals." 34 artists gathered during the summer months and produced 24 "La Lucha Continua" murals on the surrounding walls of the garden. Many of the murals have been destroyed through building renovation or destruction, existing murals on the west wall have faded, but still stand today.
