= Płaza =

- Village
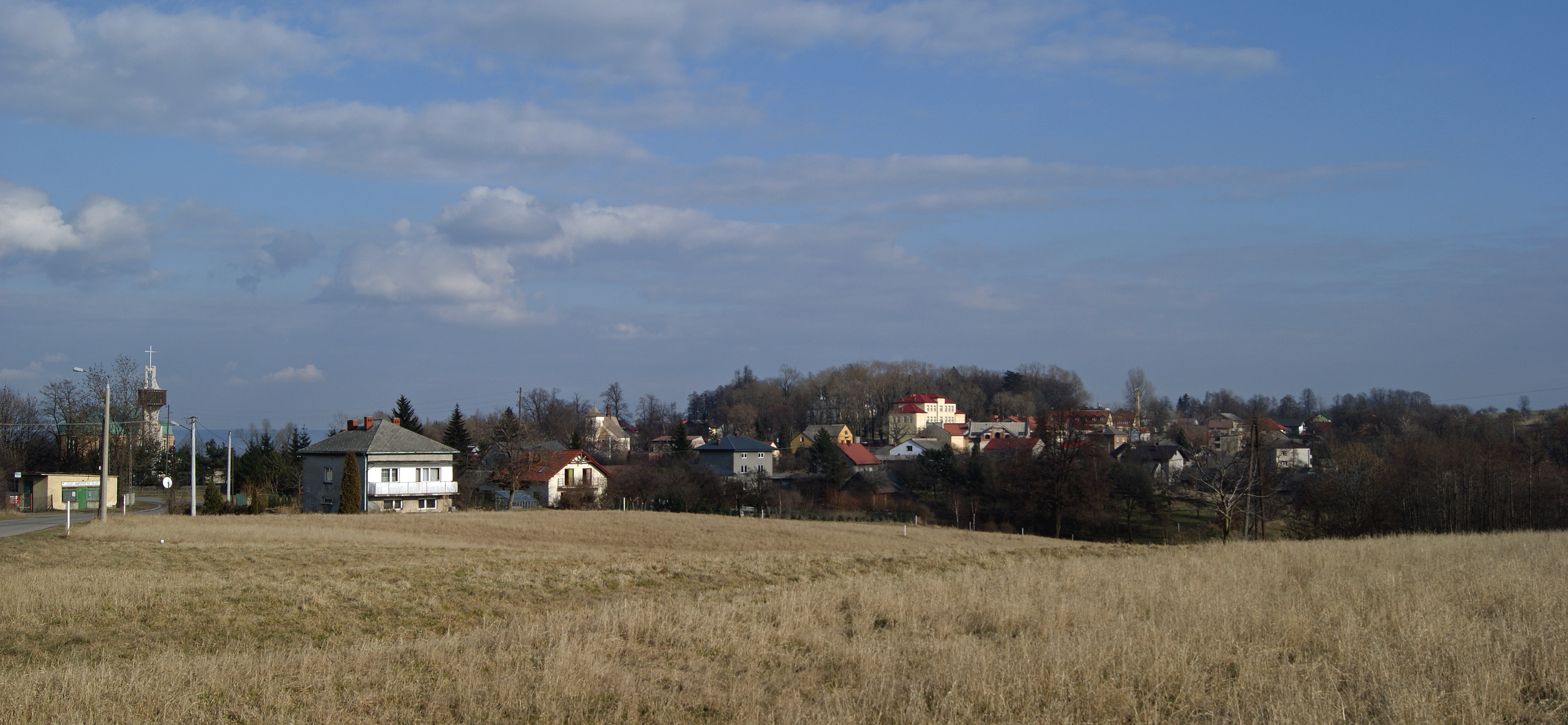
- View from the southwest

- Location within Poland
- Coordinates: 50°6′N 19°28′E
- Country: Poland
- Voivodeship: Lesser Poland
- County: Chrzanów
- Gmina: Chrzanów

Population
  - Total: 3,900

Płaza [ˈpwaza] is a village in the administrative district of Gmina Chrzanów, within Chrzanów County, Lesser Poland Voivodeship, in southern Poland.

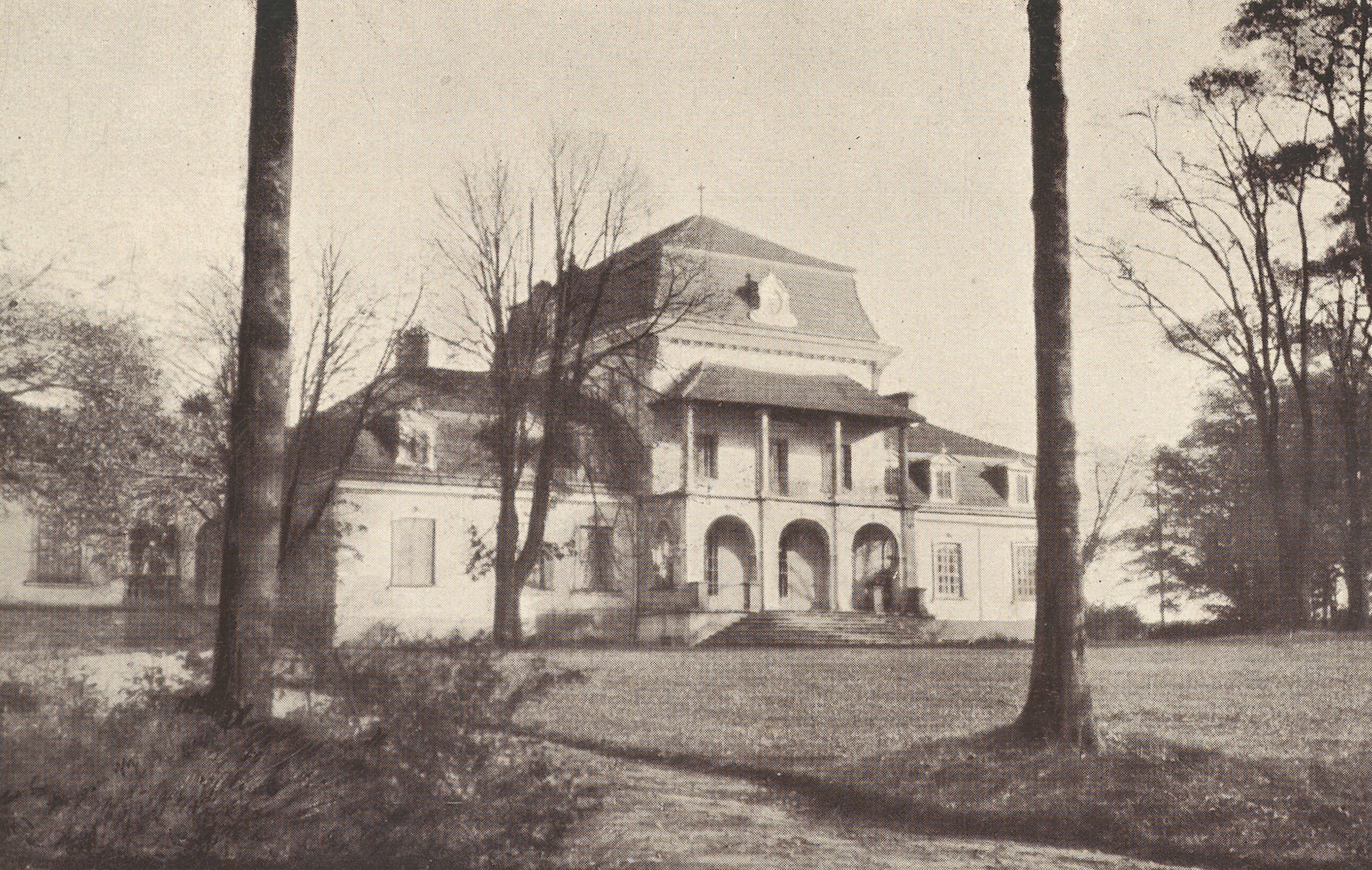
Palace before 1911
