= Wygiełzów, Lesser Poland Voivodeship =

Wygiełzów
- Village
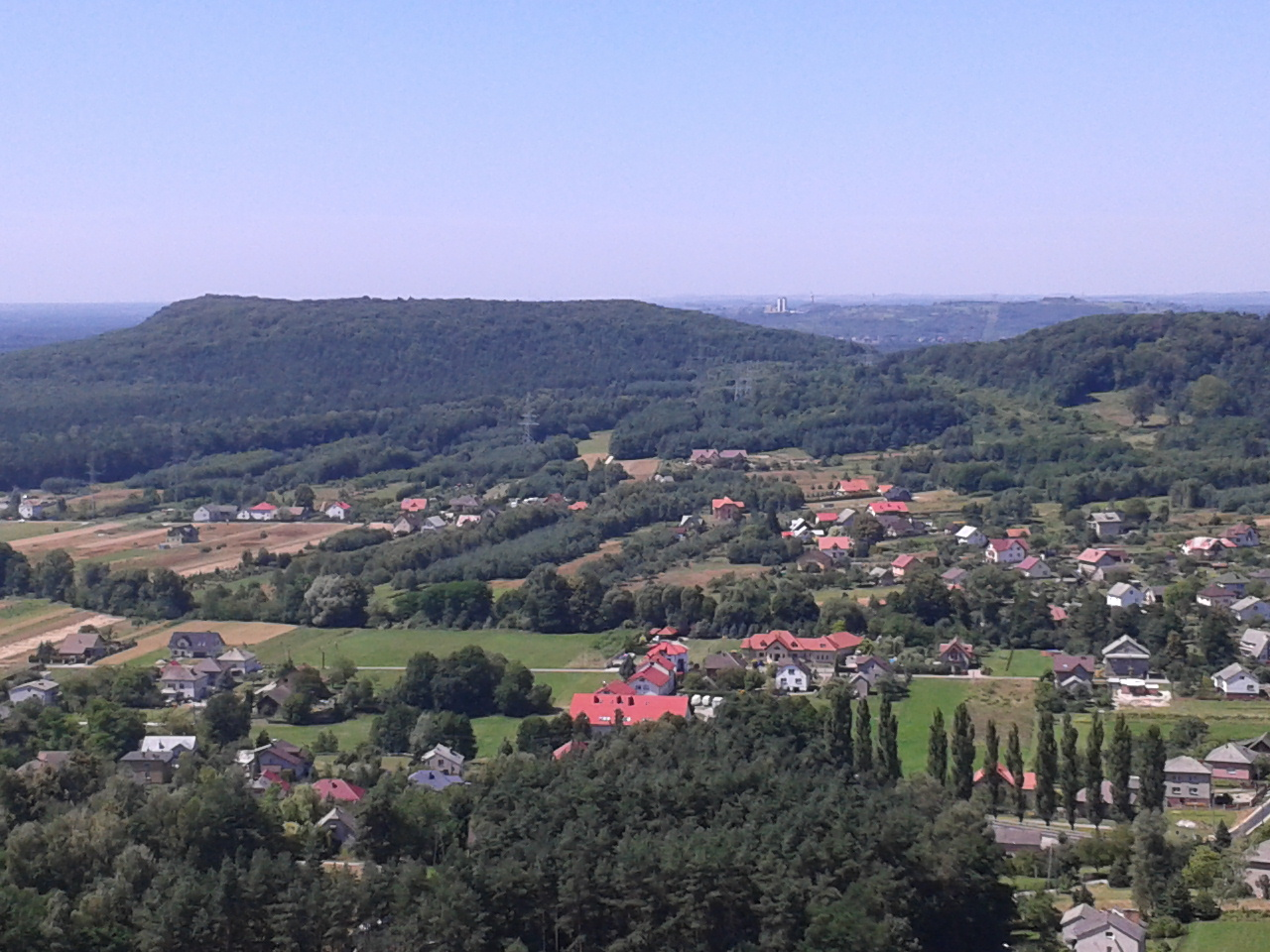

- Location within Poland
- Coordinates: 50°4′31″N 19°26′10″E
- Country: Poland
- Voivodeship: Lesser Poland
- County: Chrzanów
- Gmina: Babice
- Population: 645

Wygiełzów [vɨˈɡʲɛu̯zuf] is a village in the administrative district of Gmina Babice, within Chrzanów County, Lesser Poland Voivodeship, in southern Poland.
