= Grojec, Chrzanów County =

Grojec
- Village
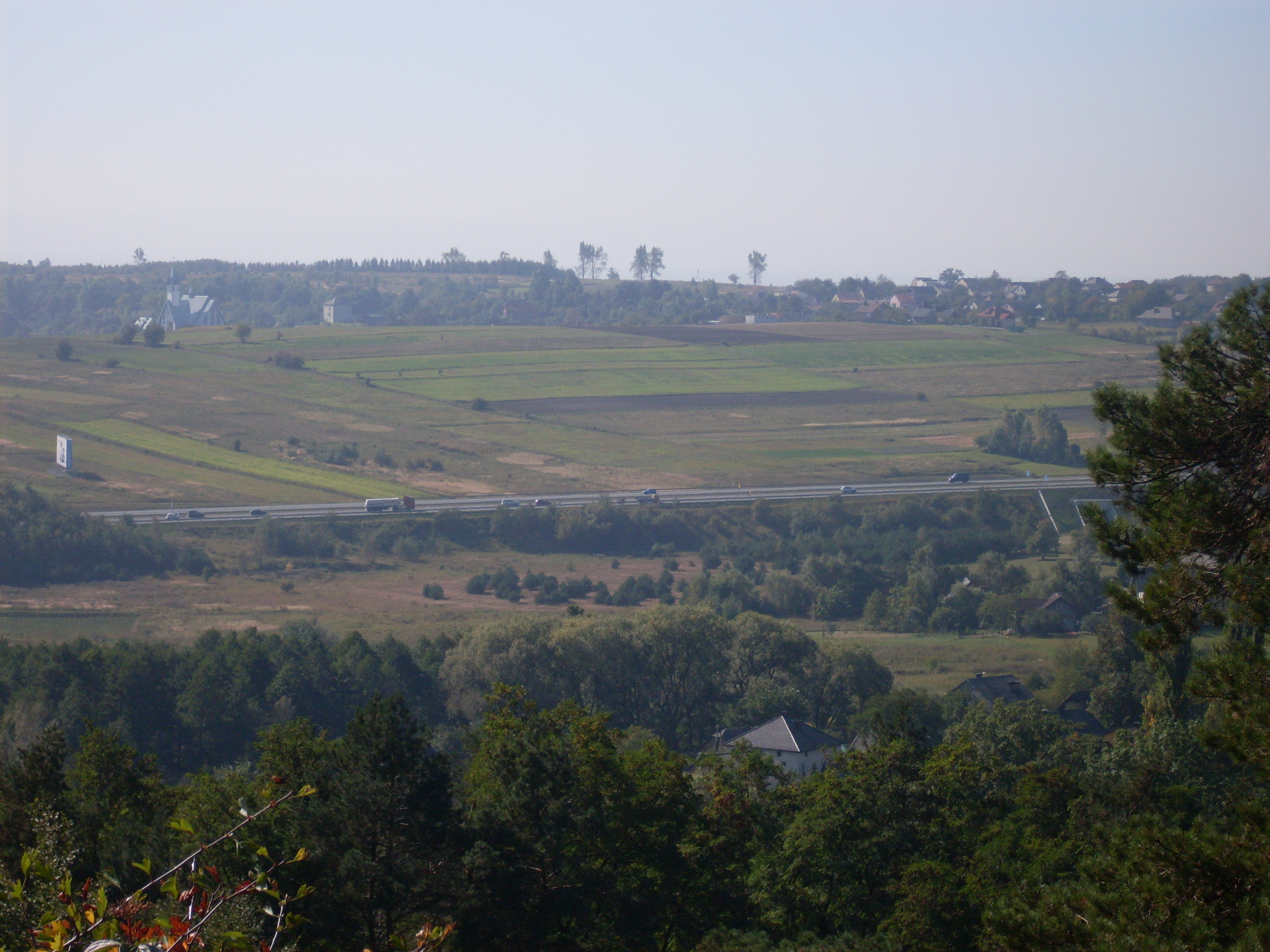
- View from A4

- Location within Poland
- Coordinates: 50°5′14″N 19°33′43″E
- Country: Poland
- Voivodeship: Lesser Poland
- County: Chrzanów
- Gmina: Alwernia
- Population: 1,259

Grojec [ˈɡrɔjɛt͡s] is a village in the administrative district of Gmina Alwernia, within Chrzanów County, Lesser Poland Voivodeship, in southern Poland.
