= Zagórze, Chrzanów County =

Zagórze
- Village
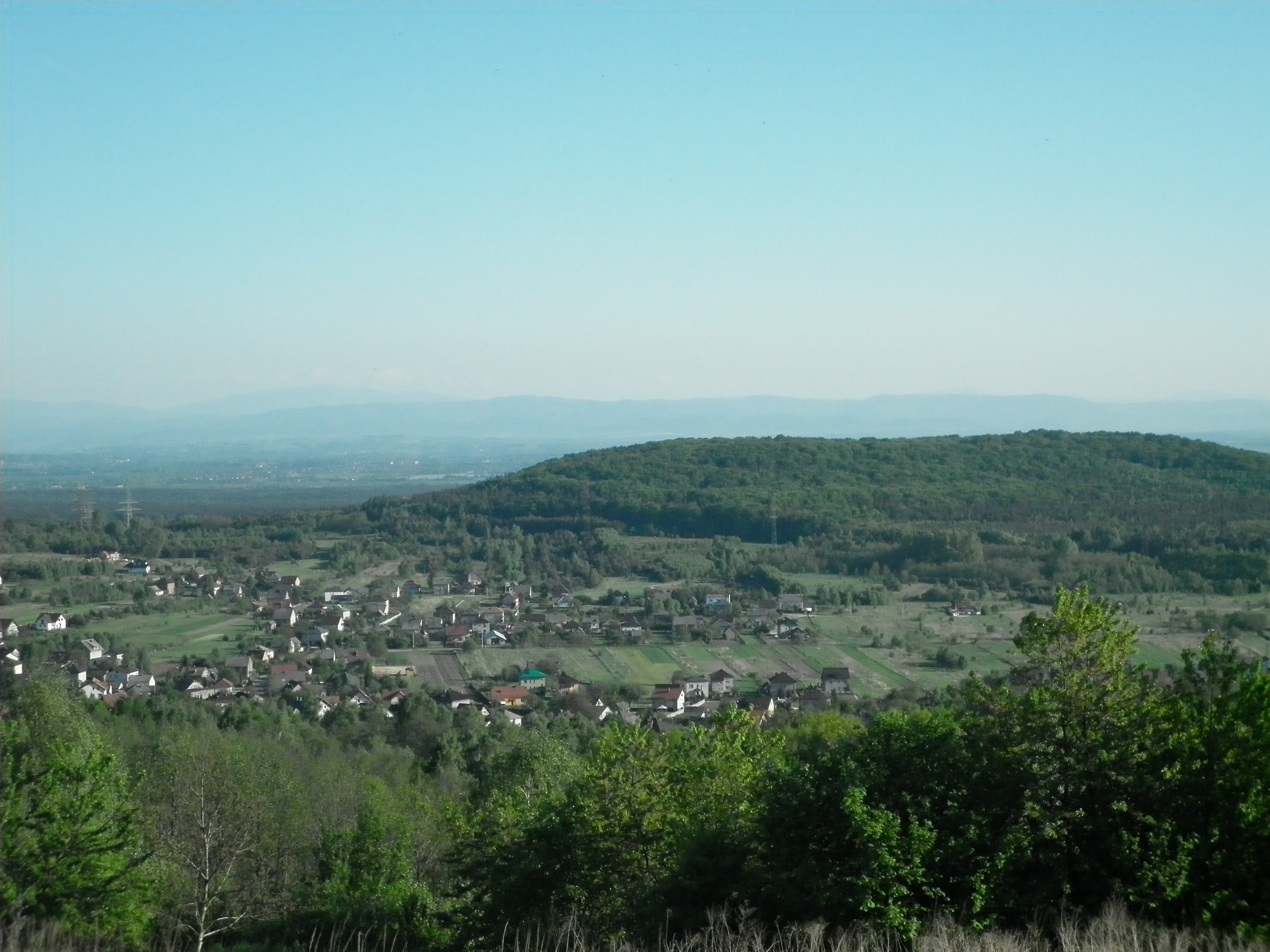
- Zagórze

- Location within Poland
- Coordinates: 50°5′41″N 19°24′14″E
- Country: Poland
- Voivodeship: Lesser Poland
- County: Chrzanów
- Gmina: Babice
- Population: 2,963

Zagórze [zaˈɡuʐɛ] is a village in the administrative district of Gmina Babice, within Chrzanów County, Lesser Poland Voivodeship, in southern Poland.
