= Rozkochów, Lesser Poland Voivodeship =

Rozkochów
- Village
- Location within Poland
- Coordinates: 50°2′42″N 19°29′12″E
- Country: Poland
- Voivodeship: Lesser Poland
- County: Chrzanów
- Gmina: Babice
- Population: 778

Rozkochów [rɔsˈkɔxuf] is a village in the administrative district of Gmina Babice, within Chrzanów County, Lesser Poland Voivodeship, in southern Poland.
