= Mętków =

- Village
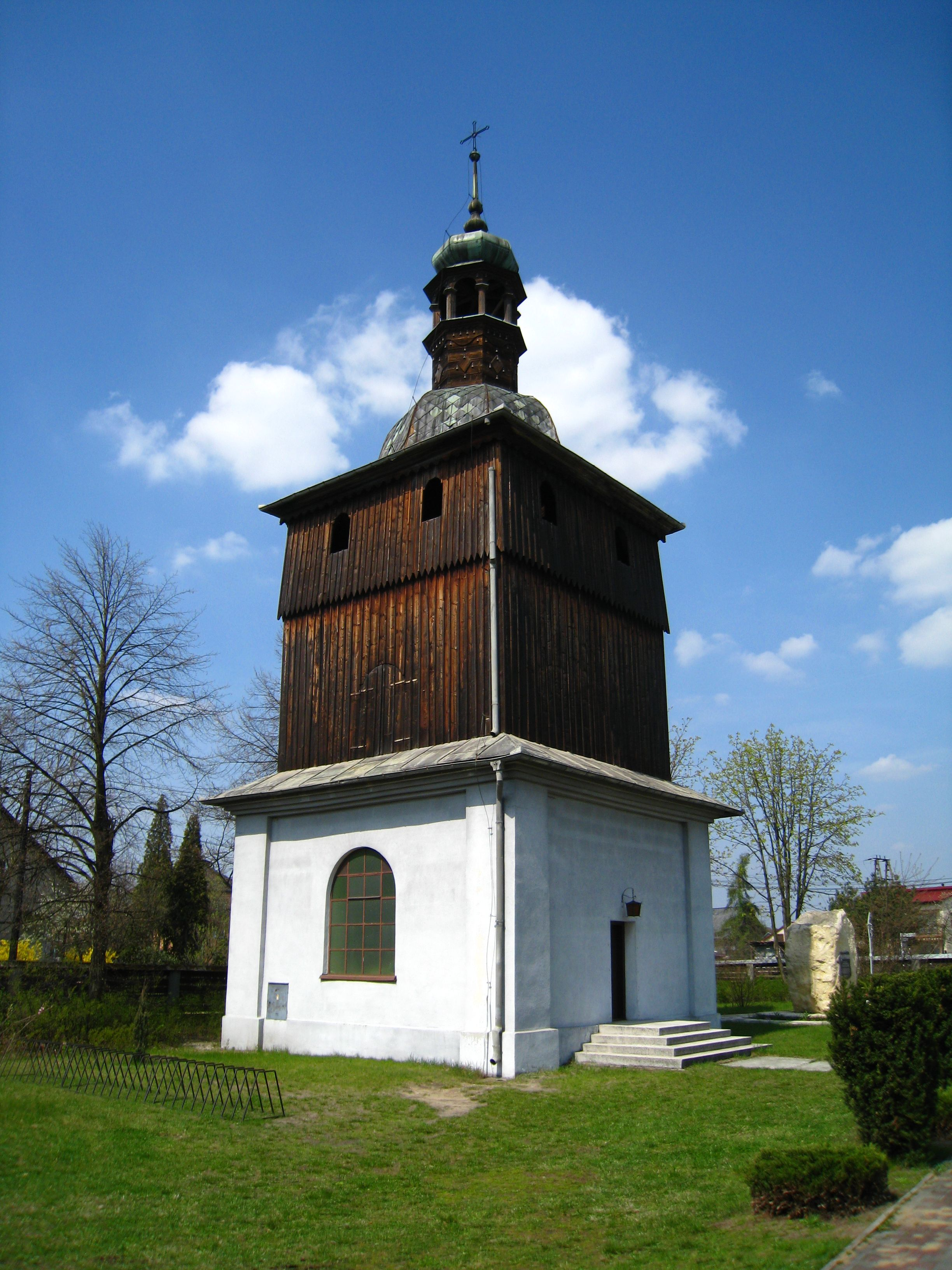

- Location within Poland
- Coordinates: 50°3′5″N 19°22′21″E
- Country: Poland
- Voivodeship: Lesser Poland
- County: Chrzanów
- Gmina: Babice
- Population: 1,480

Mętków [ˈmɛntkuf] is a village in the administrative district of Gmina Babice, within Chrzanów County, Lesser Poland Voivodeship, in southern Poland.
