= Okleśna =

- Village
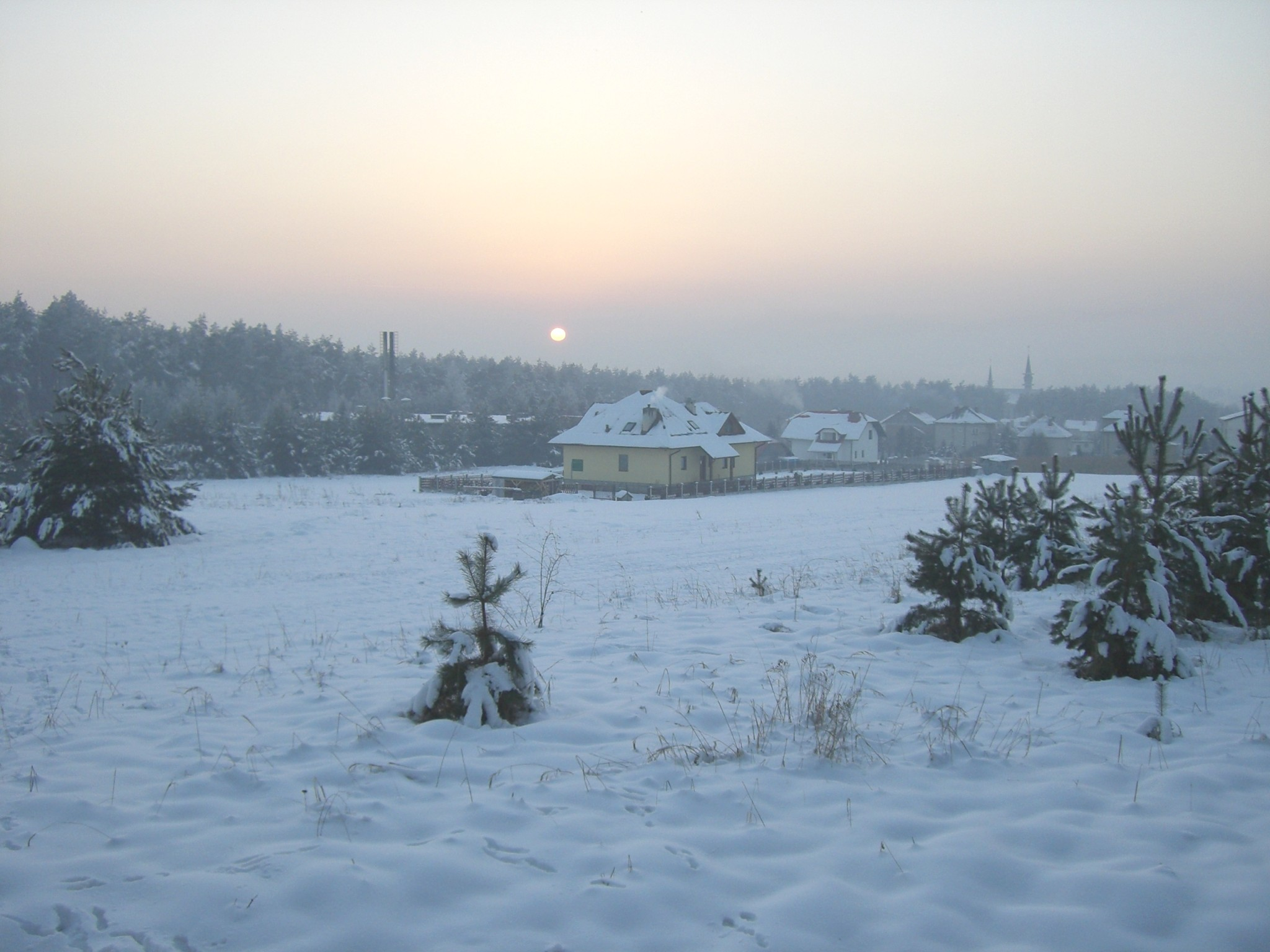

- Location within Poland
- Coordinates: 50°2′N 19°31′E
- Country: Poland
- Voivodeship: Lesser Poland
- County: Chrzanów
- Gmina: Alwernia
- Highest elevation: 314 m (1,030 ft)
- Lowest elevation: 215 m (705 ft)
- Population: 957
- Website: http://www.oklesna.pl/

Okleśna [ɔˈklɛɕna] is a village in the administrative district of Gmina Alwernia, within Chrzanów County, Lesser Poland Voivodeship, in southern Poland.
