= Brodła =

- Village
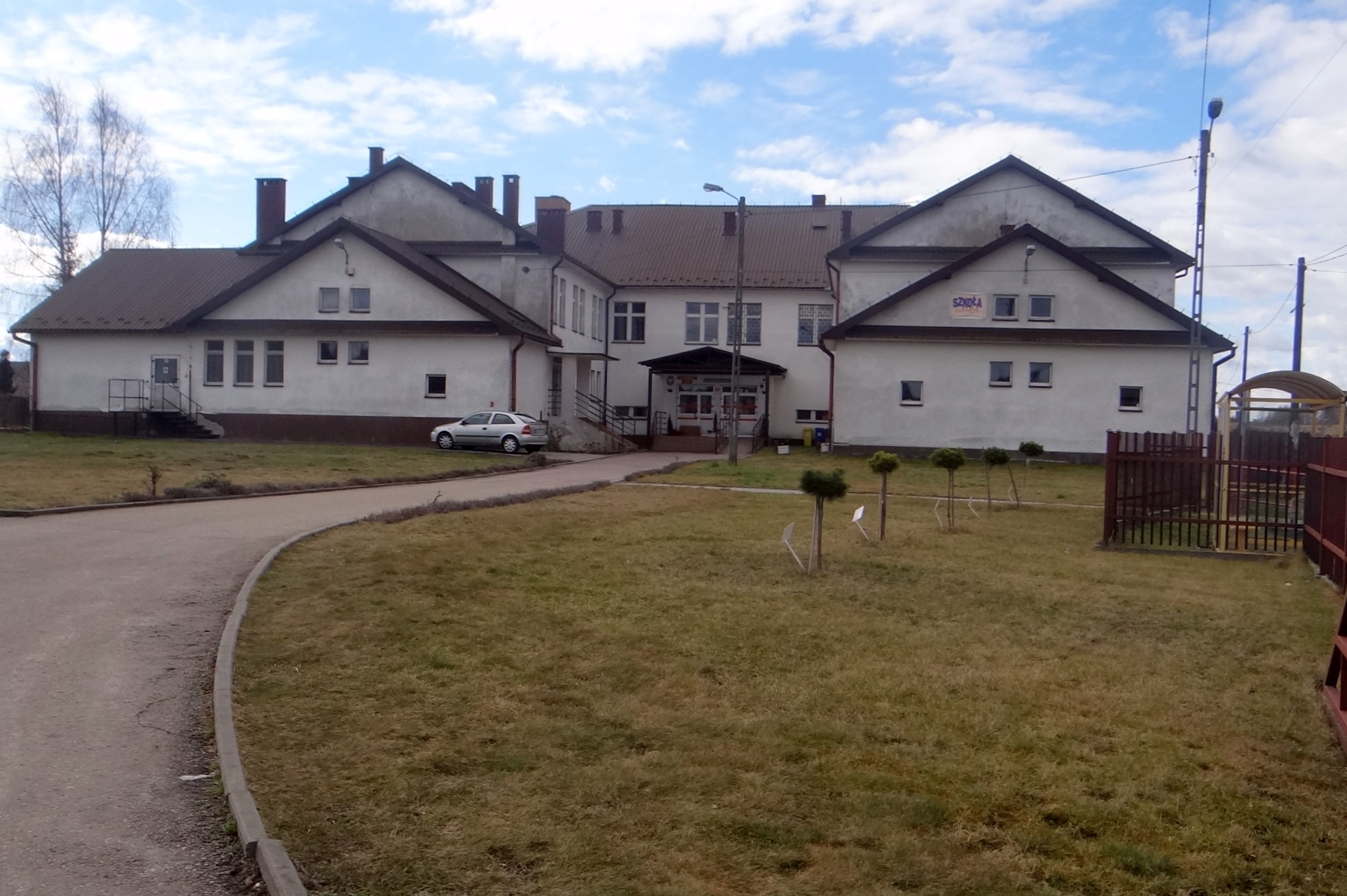

- Location within Poland
- Coordinates: 50°3′N 19°36′E
- Country: Poland
- Voivodeship: Lesser Poland
- County: Chrzanów
- Gmina: Alwernia
- Population: 1,005

Brodła [ˈbrɔdwa] is a village in the administrative district of Gmina Alwernia, within Chrzanów County, Lesser Poland Voivodeship, in southern Poland.

In 1595, the village located in the Poviat of the Kraków Province was owned by Aleksander Myszkowski. In the years 1975-1998 the town was located in the Krakow province. In the village there is a historic figure of Saint. John of Nepomuk from 1783 made in the Baroque style. In Brodła, there is a Mass Chapel named after Heart of Jesus. To the north of the center of the village is the Prześnice hill.
