= Olszyny, Chrzanów County =

Olszyny
- Village
- Location within Poland
- Coordinates: 50°3′9″N 19°27′3″E
- Country: Poland
- Voivodeship: Lesser Poland
- County: Chrzanów
- Gmina: Babice
- Population (approx.): 750

Olszyny [ɔlˈʂɨnɨ] is a village in the administrative district of Gmina Babice, within Chrzanów County, Lesser Poland Voivodeship, in southern Poland.

The village has an approximate population of 750.
