= Jankowice, Chrzanów County =

Jankowice
- Village
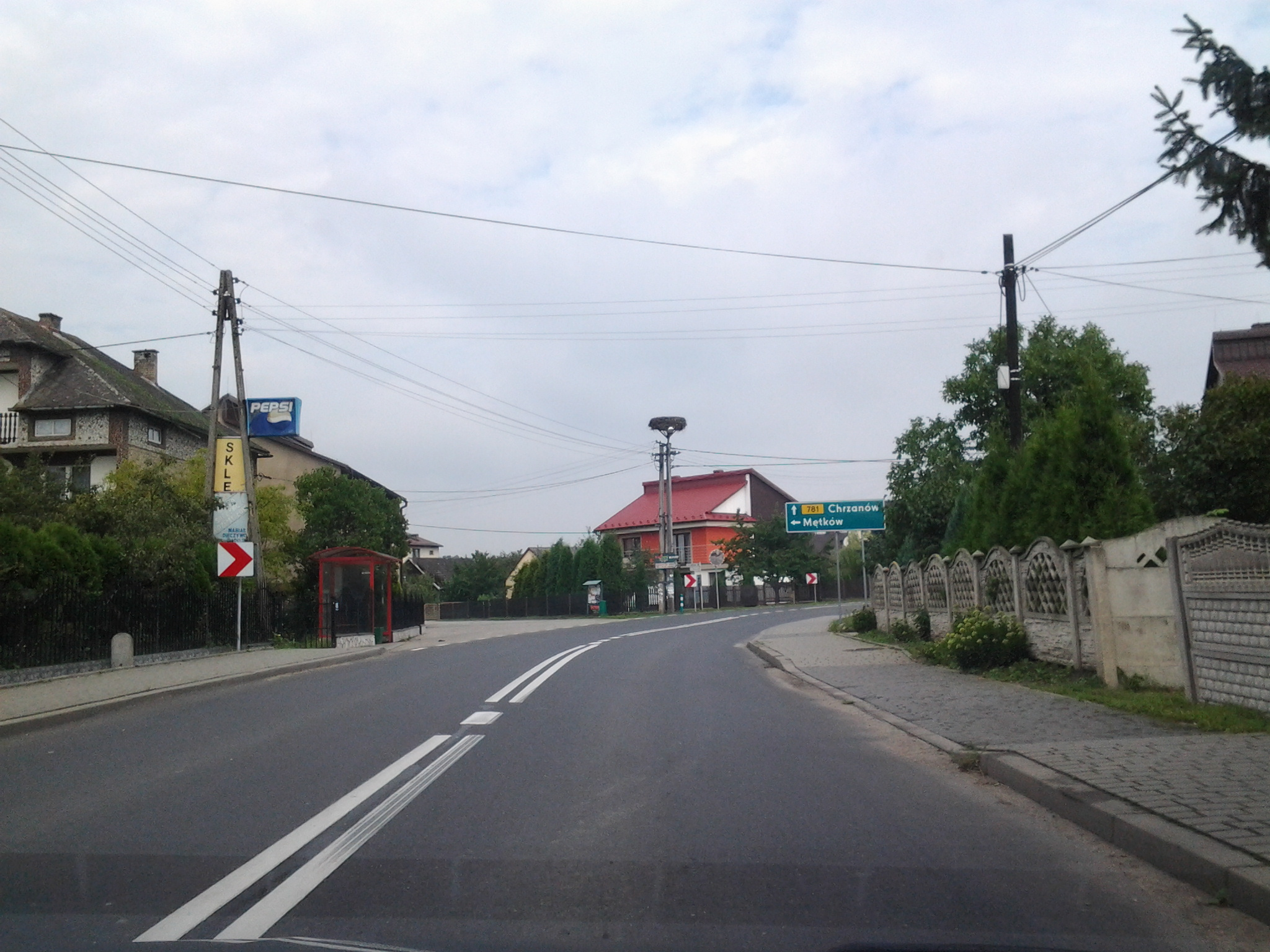

- Location within Poland
- Coordinates: 50°2′35″N 19°26′26″E
- Country: Poland
- Voivodeship: Lesser Poland
- County: Chrzanów
- Gmina: Babice
- Population: 770

Jankowice [jankɔˈvit͡sɛ] is a village in the administrative district of Gmina Babice, within Chrzanów County, Lesser Poland Voivodeship, in southern Poland.
