= Mirów, Chrzanów County =

Mirów
- Village
- Location within Poland
- Coordinates: 50°2′0″N 19°31′0″E
- Country: Poland
- Voivodeship: Lesser Poland
- County: Chrzanów
- Gmina: Alwernia
- Population: 304

Mirów [ˈmʲiruf] is a village in the administrative district of Gmina Alwernia, within Chrzanów County, Lesser Poland Voivodeship, in southern Poland.
