= Mirów =

Mirów may refer to the following places in Poland:

- Mirów, Warsaw, part of the Wola district of Warsaw
- Mirów, a district of Częstochowa
- Mirów, a district of Gdańsk
- Mirów, a district of Pińczów
- Mirów, Chrzanów County in Lesser Poland Voivodeship (south Poland)
- Mirów, Przasnysz County in Masovian Voivodeship (east-central Poland)
- Mirów, Szydłowiec County in Masovian Voivodeship (east-central Poland)
- Mirów, Silesian Voivodeship (south Poland)
