= Włosień, Lesser Poland Voivodeship =

Włosień
- Village
- Location within Poland
- Coordinates: 50°03′41″N 19°27′55″E
- Country: Poland
- Voivodeship: Lesser Poland
- County: Chrzanów
- Gmina: Babice

Włosień [ˈvwɔɕɛɲ] is a village in the administrative district of Gmina Babice, within Chrzanów County, Lesser Poland Voivodeship, in southern Poland.
