= Włosień =

Włosień may refer to the following places in Poland:

- Włosień, Lower Silesian Voivodeship (south-west Poland)
- Włosień, Lesser Poland Voivodeship (south Poland)
