= Tenczynek Landscape Park =

Protected area in Poland

Coordinates: 50°05′59″N 19°38′42″E

- Tenczyński Park Krajobrazowy
- IUCN category V (protected landscape/seascape)
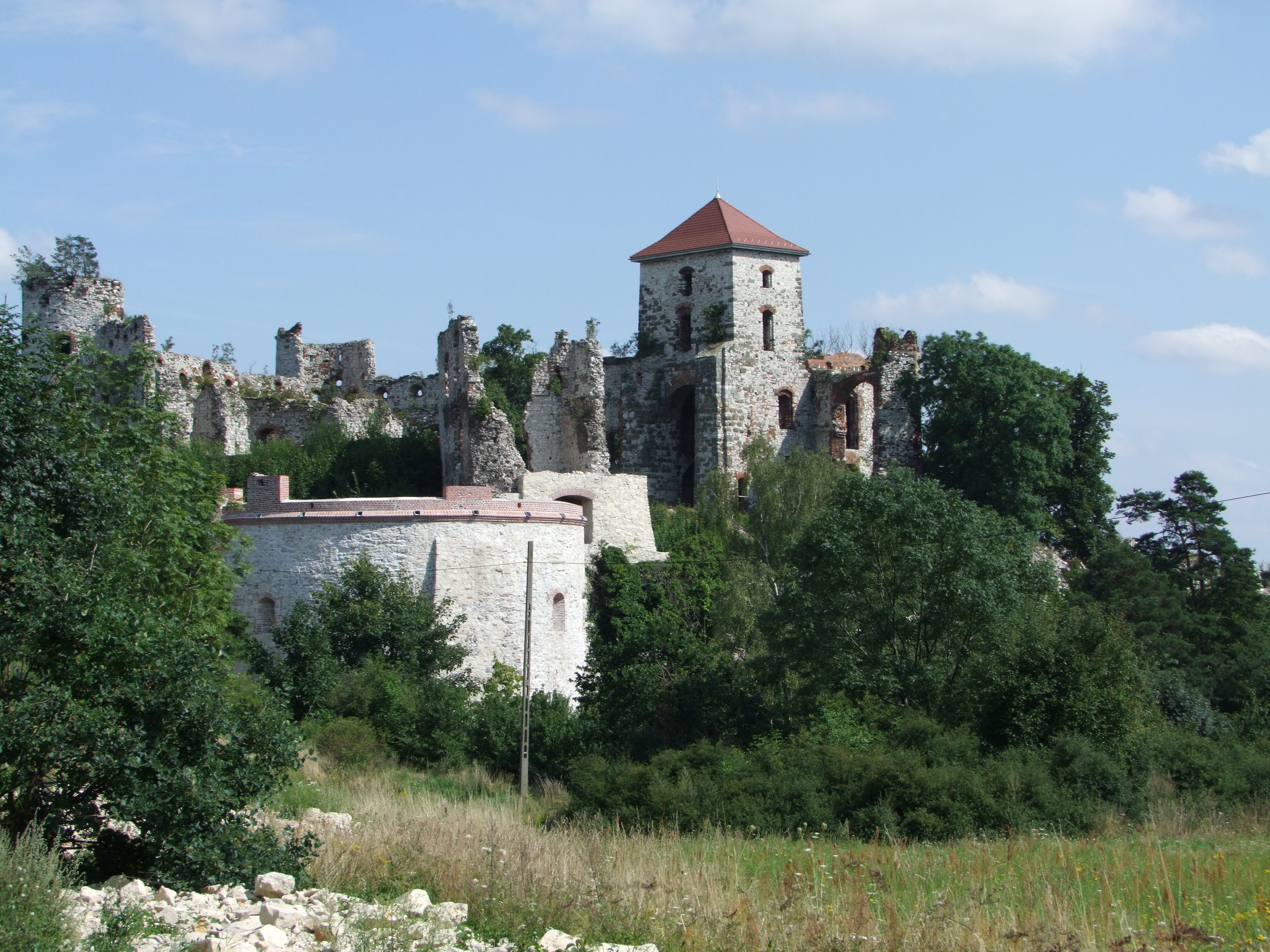
- Picturesque ruins of the Tenczyn Castle in the park
- Interactive map of Tenczynek Landscape Park
- Location: Lesser Poland Voivodeship
- Area: 117.47 km^{2} (45.36 sq mi)
- Established: 1981

Tenczynek Landscape Park (Tenczyński Park Krajobrazowy) is a protected area (a Landscape Park) in southern Poland, established in 1981, and covering an area of 117.47 square kilometres (45.36 sq mi).

The Park lies within Lesser Poland Voivodeship: in Chrzanów County (Gmina Chrzanów, Gmina Alwernia, Gmina Babice, Gmina Trzebinia) and Kraków County (Gmina Krzeszowice, Gmina Liszki, Gmina Wielka Wieś, Gmina Zabierzów). It takes its name from the village of Tenczynek in Gmina Krzeszowice. Within the Landscape Park are five nature reserves.

About 35% of the park's area is covered by forests. Carpathian beech forests, mixed pine and oak forests, alder riparian forests and broadleaved forests with a predominance of beech, oak and sycamore grow here. Pine forests dominate in the area of the Dulowska Primeval Forest.

Protected plant species can be found here: rolling hen-and-chicks, monkshood, ivy, martagon lily, sweet woodruff, goat's beard, round-leaved sundew, dwarf periwinkle and giant horsetail; and animals: moose, Eurasian sparrowhawk, barn owl, common buzzard, northern lapwing, corn crake and European pond turtle.

== Tenczyn Castle ==
Tenczynek Landscape Park is the location of a medieval Tenczyn Castle built around 1570 as a seat of the powerful Tęczyński family. The castle fell into ruin during the Deluge in mid-17th century, after being pillaged and burned by Swedish-Brandenburgian forces looking for the Polish Crown Jewels and the rumored treasures of the Tęczyński family.
