= Josef Fränkel =

Jewish engineer

- Born: 26 May 1920; Alwernia, Poland
- Died: 31 January 1994 (aged 73); Darmstadt, Germany
- Occupation: Engineer

Josef Fränkel (26 May 1920 – 31 January 1994) was a Jewish engineer who, during the course of World War II, survived the Gross-Rosen concentration camp and went on to be a key figure in reestablishing the Jewish community in Darmstadt.

== Biography ==
Fränkel was born on 26 May 1920 in Alwernia, Poland.

Fränkel would meet his future wife Johanna at Gross-Rosen concentration camp. He would see the inside of five separate camps before the end of World War II.

=== Entering Darmstadt ===
After the war Fränkel and his wife would attempt to immigrate to the United States, but would be denied admittance due to a lung condition he had developed. Instead the two of them would travel to Darmstadt, West Germany to study. During his studies he would join the local Jewish Student Union while working on an engineering degree.

Following the war Fränkel would found the Jewish community of Darmstadt, which he would chair until his death. While serving in this role, he would receive the key to the new synagogue, which replaced the three that were destroyed by the Nazis, from the city's mayor in 1988. He was a vocal advocate for modernizing the community, notably relating the difficulty of negotiating a balance between adopting modern practices while working to provide an alternative the orthodox structures people were more familiar with.

Fränkel died on 31 January 1994 in Darmstadt, survived by his wife and two daughters.
