= Regulice, Lesser Poland Voivodeship =

Regulice
- Village
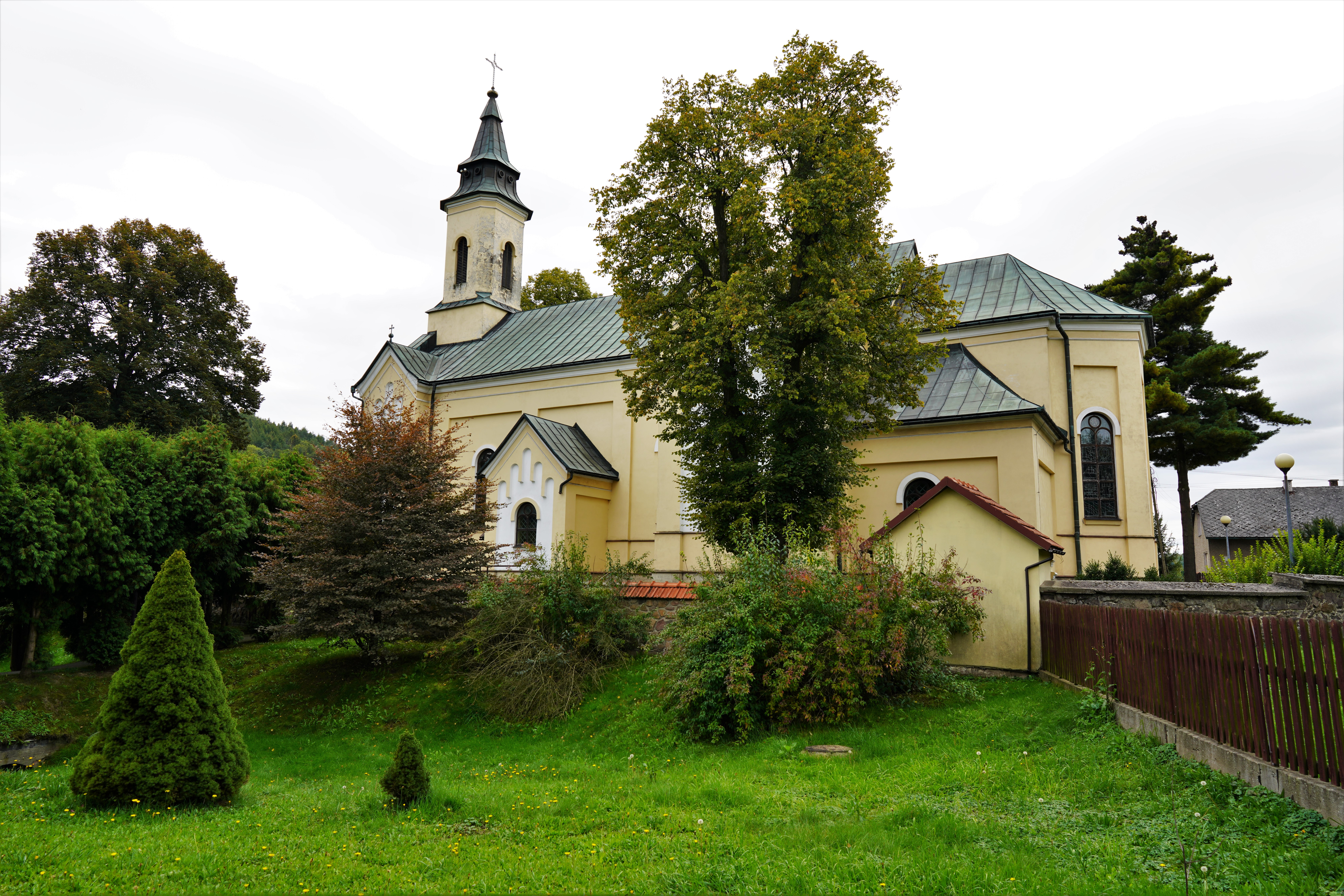
- Church of Saint Lawrence

- Location within Poland
- Coordinates: 50°5′0″N 19°31′42″E
- Country: Poland
- Voivodeship: Lesser Poland
- County: Chrzanów
- Gmina: Alwernia

Population
  - Total: 1,882
- Time zone: UTC+1 (CET)
  - Summer (DST): UTC+2 (CEST)
- Vehicle registration: KCH
- Website: http://www.regulice.info/

Regulice [rɛɡuˈlʲit͡sɛ] is a village in the administrative district of Gmina Alwernia, within Chrzanów County, Lesser Poland Voivodeship, in southern Poland.

The officially protected traditional food of Regulice (as designated by the Ministry of Agriculture and Rural Development of Poland) is krówka regulicka, a local type of krówka (traditional Polish candy).
