= Gmina Babice =

Gmina Babice Babice Commune
- Gmina
- Flag Coat of arms
- Interactive map of Gmina Babice
- Coordinates (Babice): 50°4′12″N 19°26′55″E
- Country: Poland
- Voivodeship: Lesser Poland
- County: Chrzanów
- Seat: Babice

Area
  - Total: 54.47 km^{2} (21.03 sq mi)

Population (2006)
  - Total: 8,803
  - Density: 161.6/km^{2} (418.6/sq mi)
- Website: http://www.babice.pl/

Gmina Babice is a rural gmina (administrative district) in Chrzanów County, Lesser Poland Voivodeship, in southern Poland. Its seat is the village of Babice, which lies approximately 8 kilometres (5 mi) south-east of Chrzanów and 36 km (22 mi) west of the regional capital Kraków.

The gmina covers an area of 54.47 square kilometres (21.0 sq mi), and as of 2006 its total population is 8,803.

The gmina contains part of the protected area called Tenczynek Landscape Park.

== Villages ==
Gmina Babice contains the villages and settlements of Babice, Jankowice, Mętków, Olszyny, Rozkochów, Włosień, Wygiełzów and Zagórze.

== Neighbouring gminas ==
Gmina Babice is bordered by the gminas of Alwernia, Chrzanów, Libiąż, Przeciszów and Zator.
