= Gmina Alwernia =

Gmina Alwernia Alwernia Commune
- Gmina
- Coat of arms
- Interactive map of Gmina Alwernia
- Coordinates (Alwernia): 50°4′N 19°31′E
- Country: Poland
- Voivodeship: Lesser Poland
- County: Chrzanów
- Seat: Alwernia

Area
  - Total: 75.27 km^{2} (29.06 sq mi)

Population (2006)
  - Total: 12,689
  - Density: 168.6/km^{2} (436.6/sq mi)
  - Urban: 3,406
  - Rural: 9,283
- Website: http://www.alwernia.pl/

Gmina Alwernia is an urban-rural gmina (administrative district) in Chrzanów County, Lesser Poland Voivodeship, in southern Poland. Its seat is the town of Alwernia, which lies approximately 12 kilometres (7 mi) south-east of Chrzanów and 31 km (19 mi) west of the regional capital Kraków.

The gmina covers an area of 75.27 square kilometres (29.1 sq mi), and as of 2006 its total population is 12,689 (of which the population of Alwernia is 3,406, and the population of the rural part of the gmina is 9,283).

The gmina contains part of the protected area called Tenczynek Landscape Park.

== Villages ==
Apart from the town of Alwernia, Gmina Alwernia contains the villages and settlements of Brodła, Grojec, Kwaczała, Mirów, Nieporaz, Okleśna, Podłęże, Poręba Żegoty, Regulice and Źródła.

== Neighbouring gminas ==
Gmina Alwernia is bordered by the gminas of Babice, Chrzanów, Czernichów, Krzeszowice, Spytkowice, Trzebinia and Zator.
