= Krówki =

Polish confectionery

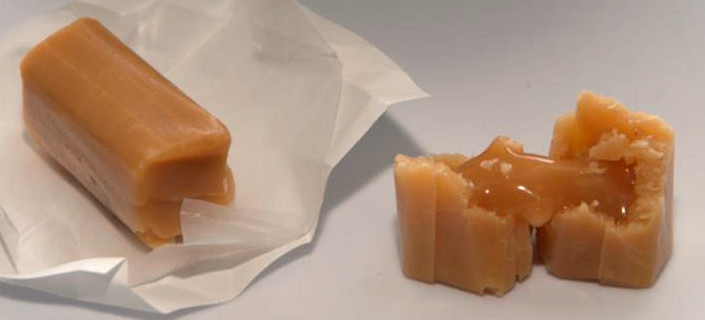
- Type: Fudge
- Place of origin: Poland
- Main ingredients: Milk, sugar, cream, butter, vanilla

Krówki ([ˈkrufki], plural; krówka singular), literally a diminutive form of the Polish word for "cow," are Polish fudge, semi-soft milk toffee candies. When hand-made, they are hard and crispy on the outside, but the inside is more fluid than solid.

It is one of the most common Polish confections, sold worldwide, and might be considered "dulce de leche candy". Commercially, many brands are available; most of them have each individual candy wrapped in white-and-yellow paper with a picture of a Holstein cow. Widely known across Europe even before the end of the Cold War, they are something of an equivalent of the White Rabbit Creamy Candy famous across East Asia, or Scottish Tablet.

The original recipe usually contains milk, sugar, and sometimes butter, cream and vanilla flavor. There are also fruit (e.g. banana), cocoa, coffee, nut, liquorice flavored krówki available, as well as versions made from soy milk for lactose intolerant consumers. Krówki can be prepared at home, using a simple cast iron pan and the above-mentioned ingredients.

The confectionery company "L. Pomorski i syn" claims that the first krówki were produced in Poznań by the Pomorski family, which was later expelled by Nazi Germans to Milanówek near Warsaw during the German occupation of Poland in World War II. There are several krówki production companies in Milanówek. Krówki were also produced in other locations before the war, including Bełchatów and Pudliszki.

In Germany, krówki are often called Muh-Muhs (after the sound cows make) or Kuhbonbons (cow bonbons).

In Latvia, this candy is called gotiņa and is considered the national candy. Originally it was made at home, and has been produced commercially since the 1930s.

== List of Traditional Polish Products ==
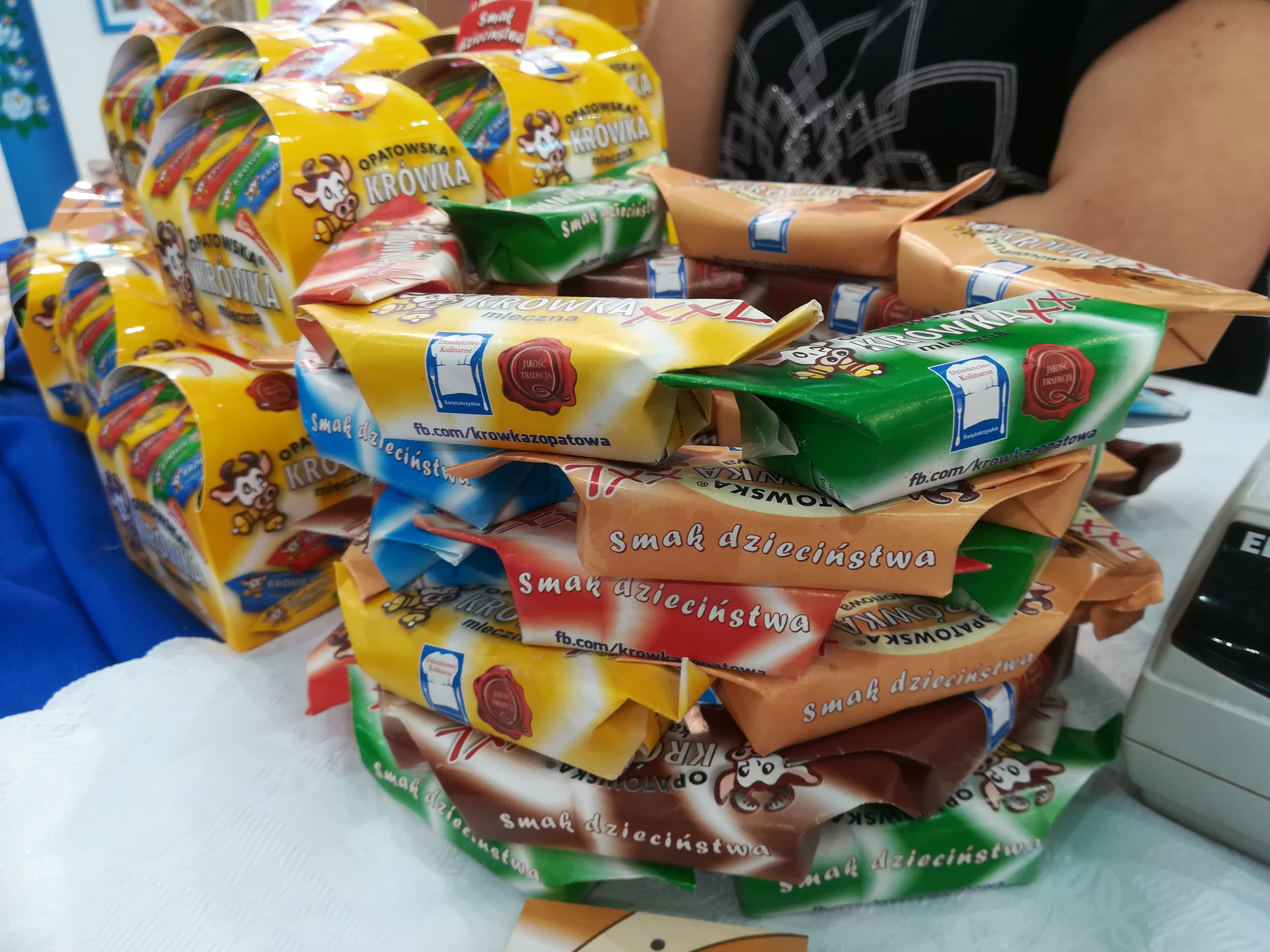
"Krówka opatowska"

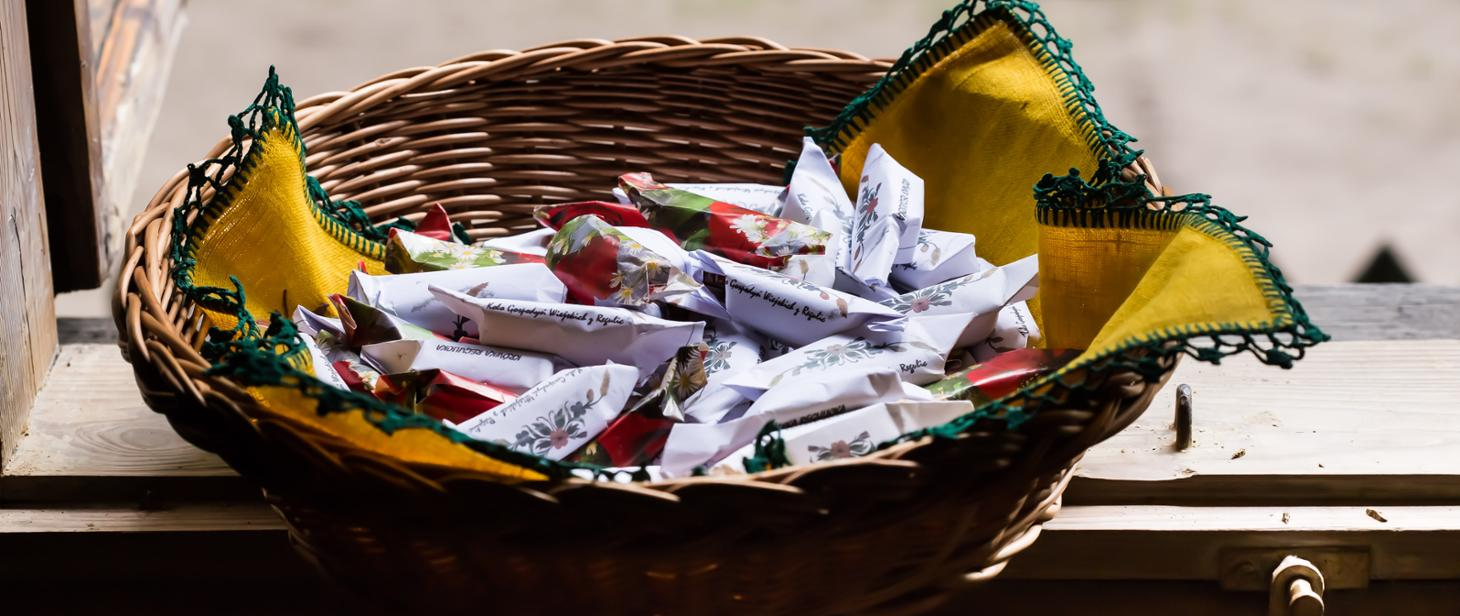
"Krówka regulicka"

Krówki added to the list of Polish Traditional Products by the Ministry of Agriculture and Rural Development:

- "Krówka opatowska" – is being made since 1982, produced in a traditional way, handmade cut and packed in Opatów, Świętokrzyskie Voivodeship. Added to the list on 7 February 2011
- "Krówka szczecinecka" – is produced since 1971, in Szczecinek, West Pomeranian Voivodeship, added to the list on 19 January 2016
- "Wyborowa krówka bełchatowska" – from Bełchatów, Łódź Voivodeship, added to the list on 30 November 2017
- "Krówka regulicka" – from Regulice, Lesser Poland Voivodeship, added to the list on 15 May 2020
- "Krówka mleczna strzyżowska" – from Strzyżów, Podkarpackie Voivodeship, added to the list on 9 June 2020

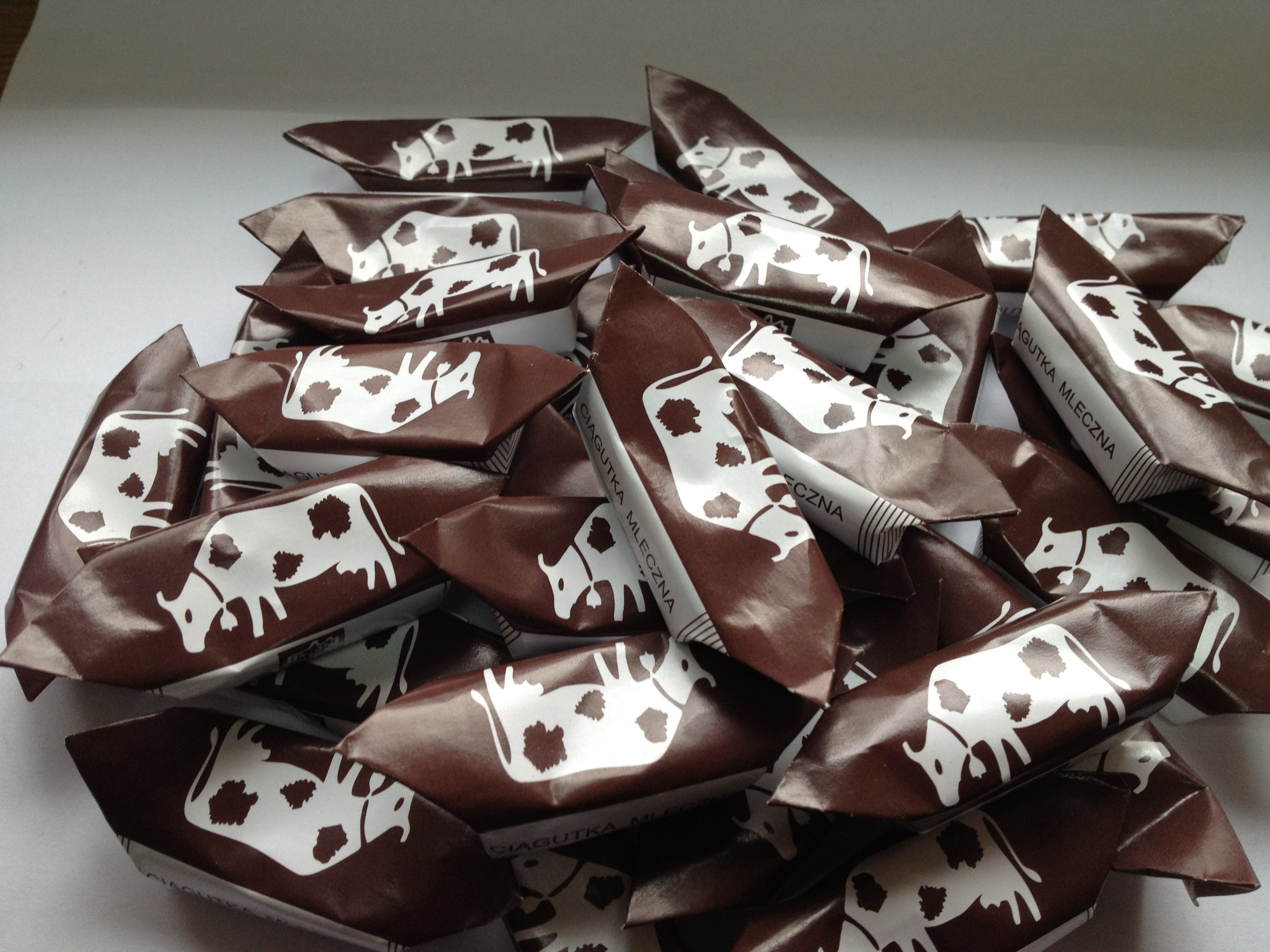
Krówka from Milanówek

== See also ==
- Cajeta
- Caramel
- Confiture de lait
- Flan
- Dulce de Leche
- List of Polish desserts
- Maillard reaction
- Penuche
- Prince Polo
- Teja
