= Zajac =

Zajac, Polish Zając, is a common Slavic name, meaning “hare”. Notable people with the surname include:

- Andrzej Zając (born 1956), Polish Paralympian
- Bogdan Zając (born 1972), Polish football defender
- Czesław Zając, Polish sport shooter
- Darcy Zajac (born 1986), Canadian professional ice hockey player
- Ihor S. Zajac, discoverer of Zajacite-(Ce), radioactive fluoride mineral in Quebec
- Jack Zajac (born 1929), American artist
- Joanna Zając (born 1990), Polish snowboarder
- Józef Zając (1891–1963), Polish general and pilot
- Karol Zając (1913–1965), Polish alpine skier
- Leanard Zajac (1890–1935), Belarusian political activist, journalist, and author of memoirs
- Lesław Zając (born 1950), Polish runner
- Marcel Zajac (born 1998), Canadian soccer player
- Marcin Zając (born 1975), Polish football midfielder
- Marek Zając (born 1973), Polish football defender
- Richard Zajac (born 1976), Slovak football player
- Rudolf Zajac (born 1951), former Minister of Health of Slovakia
- Stanisław Zając (1949–2010), Polish politician
- Tomasz Zając (born 1995), Polish footballer
- Travis Zajac (born 1985), Canadian ice hockey player

== See also ==
- Elaine Zayak (born 1965), American figure skater
