= Alwernia =

- Town
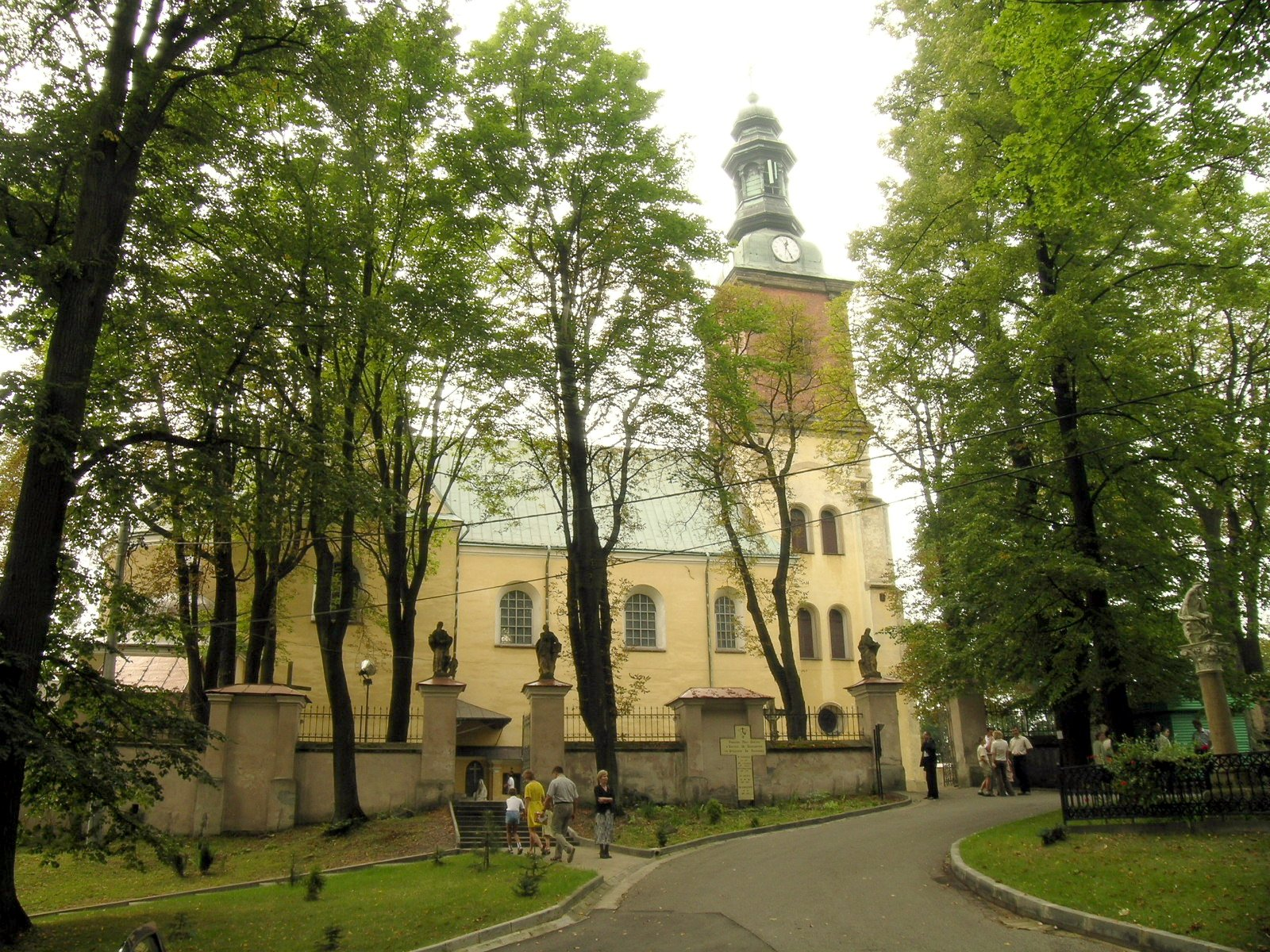
- Church of the Stigmata of St. Francis de Assisi in Alwernia

- Coat of arms

- Location within Poland
- Coordinates: 50°03′43″N 19°32′28″E
- Country: Poland
- Voivodeship: Lesser Poland
- County: Chrzanów
- Gmina: Alwernia
- Founded: 1616
- Town rights: 1 October 1993

Government
  - Mayor: Beata Nadzieja-Szpila

Area
  - Total: 8.88 km^{2} (3.43 sq mi)
- Elevation: 312 m (1,024 ft)

Population (30 June 2022)
  - Total: 3,284
  - Density: 370/km^{2} (960/sq mi)
- Time zone: UTC+1 (CET)
  - Summer (DST): UTC+2 (CEST)
- Postal code: 32-566
- Area code: +48 12
- Number plates: KCH
- Website: http://www.alwernia.pl

Alwernia [alˈvɛrɲa] is a town in the Chrzanów County, Lesser Poland Voivodeship, Poland, situated some 36 kilometres (22 miles) west of Kraków. The town has an area of 8.88 square kilometres (3.43 square miles), and as of June 2022 it has a population of 3,284.

== History ==
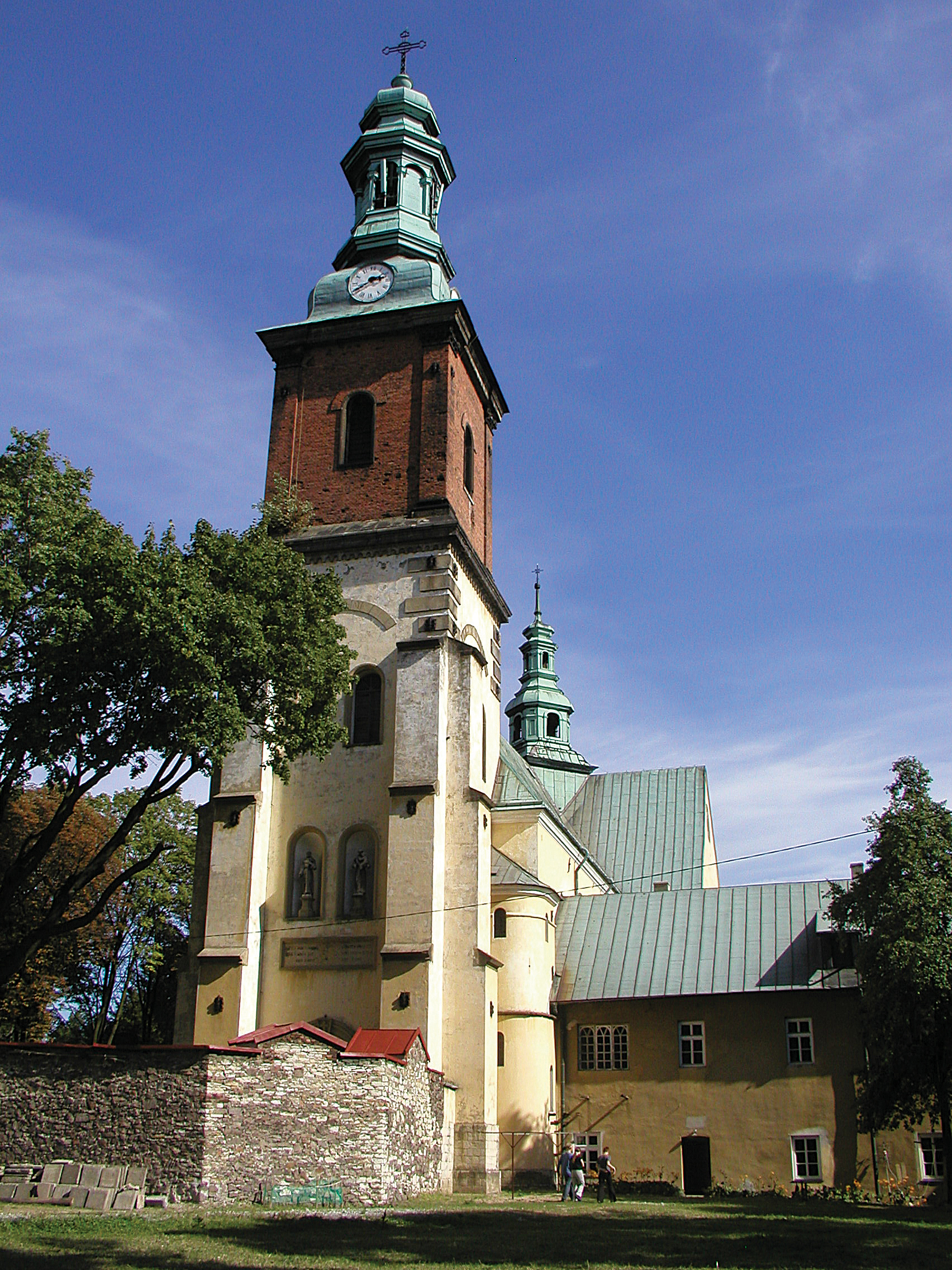
Bernardine church

The name of the town is taken from that of the Franciscan hermitage of La Verna (Latin: Alvernia) in Tuscany, Italy. It was bestowed on the locality in 1616 by the castellan Krzysztof Koryciński. A monastery of the order of the Stigmata of Saint Francis of Assisi was built on high ground between 1625 and 1656. The church dates from the period between 1630 and 1676.

Below the monastery a settlement developed which in 1776 received the right to hold a market. In 1796 Alwernia is mentioned as being a small commercial and administrative centre.

After the Third Partition of Poland, the town became a part of the Austrian Empire, and since 1867 of Austria-Hungary. In the newly-reborn Poland, Alwernia administratively belonged to Kraków Voivodeship. Following the German-Soviet invasion of Poland, which started World War II in September 1939, the town was occupied by Germany. After the war, the town once again became a part of Kraków Voivodeship until 1998.

On 15 September 1993 Alwernia received its town charter.

== Economy ==
Chemical works "Alventa" is located in the town. The works was built in 1923–1924, in the interwar period. It mainly focuses on producing phosphorus and chromium compounds, as well as fertilizers.

== Transport ==
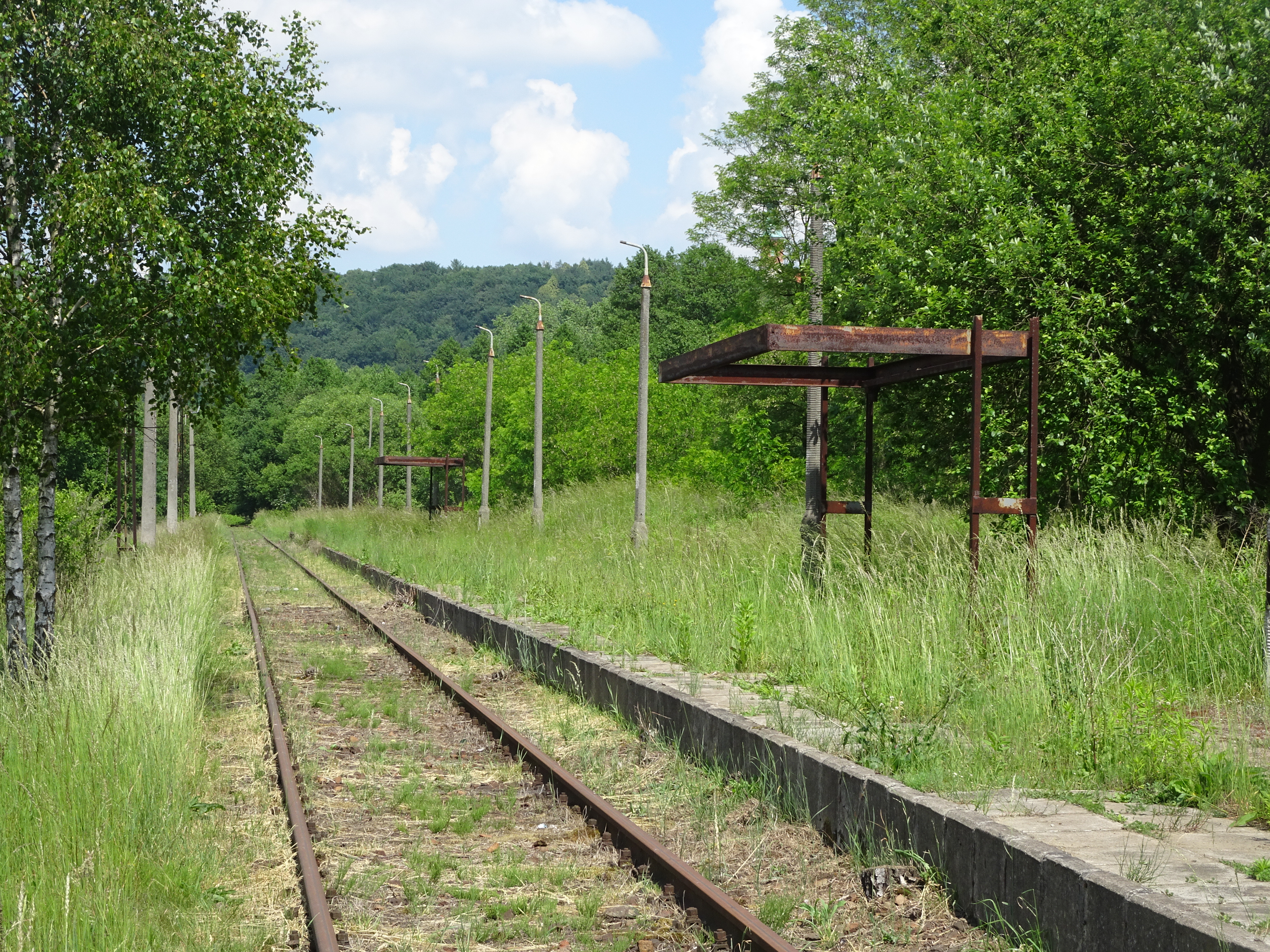
Alwernia railway station

=== Road transport ===
Voivodeship road 780 directly passes through the town. The A4 motorway, which is a part of the European route E40, passes through the village of Rudno, located about 4 kilometres (2.5 miles) north of the town.

=== Rail transport ===
The Trzebinia–Wadowice railway, opened in 1899, passes through the town, however in October 2002 passenger service ceased. In 2017, a tourist draisine started operating on the closed railway. The railway infrastructure manager in Poland, PKP Polskie Linie Kolejowe, is planning to reconstruct the railway.

== Tourist attractions and monuments ==
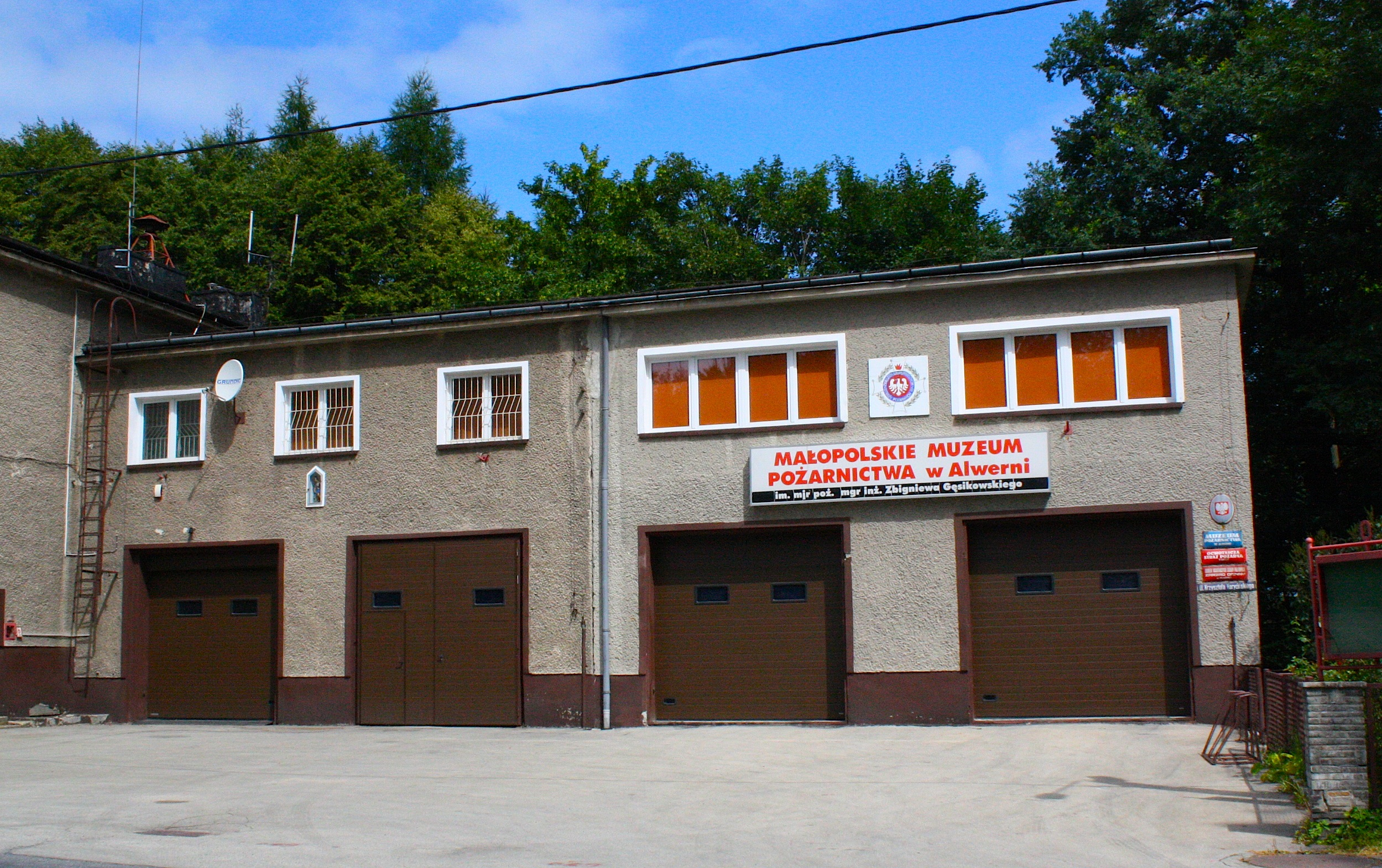
Firefighting museum

Alwernia's tourist attractions and monuments include:

- Baroque Bernardine monastery and church;
- Saint Florian chapel;
- the oldest firefighting museum in Poland – Małopolskie Muzeum Pożarnictwa.
