= Chrzanów County =

Chrzanów County Powiat chrzanowski
- County
- Flag Coat of arms

- Location within Lesser Poland Voivodeship

- Division into gminas
- Coordinates (Chrzanów): 50°8′N 19°24′E
- Country: Poland
- Voivodeship: Lesser Poland
- Seat: Chrzanów
- Gminas: Total 5: Gmina Alwernia; Gmina Babice; Gmina Chrzanów; Gmina Libiąż; Gmina Trzebinia

Area
  - Total: 371.49 km^{2} (143.43 sq mi)

Population (2019)
  - Total: 124,937
  - Density: 336.31/km^{2} (871.05/sq mi)
  - Urban: 76,880
  - Rural: 40,778
- Car plates: KCH
- Website: www.powiat-chrzanowski.pl

Chrzanów County (Polish: powiat chrzanowski) is a unit of territorial administration and local government (powiat) in Lesser Poland Voivodeship, southern Poland. It came into being on January 1, 1999, as a result of the Polish local government reforms passed in 1998. Its administrative seat and largest town is Chrzanów, which lies 40 kilometres (25 mi) west of the regional capital Kraków. The county contains three other towns: Trzebinia, 8 km (5 mi) north-east of Chrzanów, Libiąż, 8 km (5 mi) south-west of Chrzanów, and Alwernia, 12 km (7 mi) south-east of Chrzanów.

The county covers an area of 371.49 square kilometres (143.4 sq mi). As of 2019 its total population is 124,937, out of which the population of Chrzanów is 36,717, that of Trzebinia is 19,778, that of Libiąż is 17,017, that of Alwernia is 3,368, and the rural population is 40,778.

== Neighbouring counties ==
Chrzanów County is bordered by Olkusz County to the north-east, Kraków County to the east, Wadowice County to the south, Oświęcim County to the south-west and the city of Jaworzno to the west.

== Administrative division ==
The county is subdivided into five gminas (four urban-rural and one rural). These are listed in the following table, in descending order of population.

Gmina	Type	Area (km^{2})	Population (2019)	Seat
Gmina Chrzanów	urban-rural	79.3	46,929	Chrzanów
Gmina Trzebinia	urban-rural	105.2	33,931	Trzebinia
Gmina Libiąż	urban-rural	57.2	22,353	Libiąż
Gmina Alwernia	urban-rural	75.3	12,589	Alwernia
Gmina Babice	rural	54.5	9,135	Babice
