= Oaklands Park =

Oaklands Park may refer to:

- Oaklands Park, Chichester, a public park in West Sussex, England
- Oaklands Park, South Australia, a suburb of Adelaide, South Australia
- Oaklands Park, Almondsbury, the home ground of Almondsbury Town A.F.C. in Gloucestershire, England
