= Plaza Cinema =

Plaza Cinema may refer to the following:

== United Kingdom ==
- Plaza Cinema, Chichester, England (1920–1960)
- Plaza cinema, Port Talbot, Wales (1940–1999; now converted)
- Plaza Cinema, Skipton, England (1912–present)
- Plaza Cinema, Stockport, England (1932–present)
- Plaza Cinema, Weston-super-Mare, England (1911–2023)

== Elsewhere ==
- Plaza Cinema, Mumbai, India

== See also ==
- Plaza Theatre (disambiguation)
- The Plaza (disambiguation)
