= Corn Exchange, Chichester =

Corn exchange and cinema in West Sussex, England

Corn Exchange
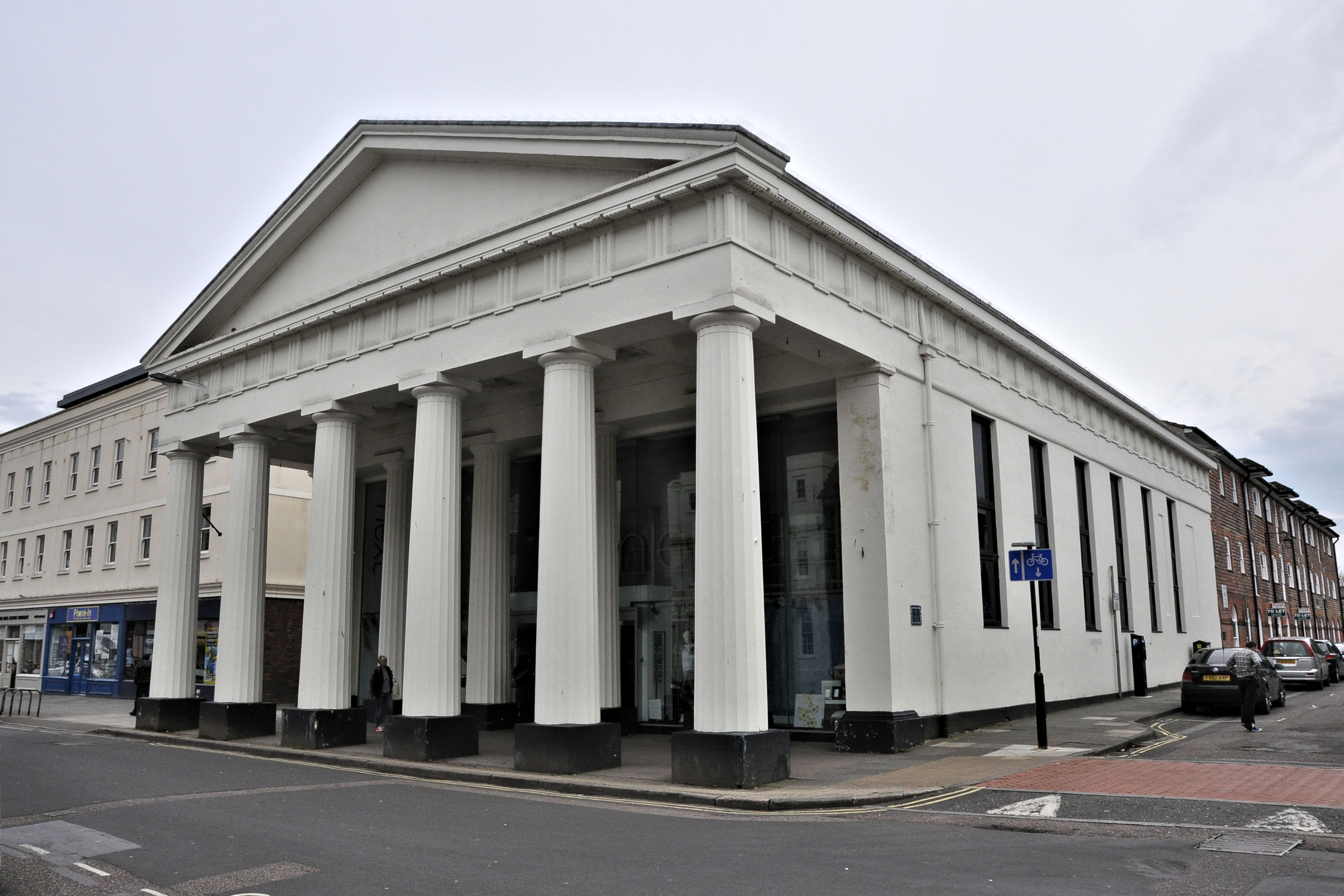
- The Corn Exchange, East Street, Chichester

- Location within Chichester city centre

General information
- Location: Chichester, England
- Coordinates: 50.8360°N 0.7756°W
- Current tenants: Next; Boston Tea Party
- Construction started: 1833

Design and construction
- Architect: George Draper

Listed Building – Grade II*
- Official name: Corn Exchange
- Designated: 5 July 1950
- Reference no.: 1192106

The Corn Exchange (also the Exchange Cinema and the Granada Exchange) is a Grade II* listed building in Chichester, West Sussex, England. Built in 1833, the building has also been used as a Granada cinema. It is currently leased to a number of companies, including Next and the Boston Tea Party café chain.

== History ==
In the late-1820s, a group of 70 corn merchants decided to form a private company, known as "Chichester Corn Exchange Limited", to finance and commission a corn exchange for the town: they each contributed between £25 and £250. The new building was designed by local architect, George Draper, and built on the corner of East Street and Baffin's Lane in Chichester between 1832 and 1833. In 1835 the roof was found to be unsafe and the building was stated to be in danger of collapse; it was rebuilt and remodelled to a design by architect John Elliott the following year.

Corn, wheat, oats and barley were commonly traded at the Corn Exchange, and in 1899 wool fleeces were also recorded as being sold at auction there. The Corn Exchange was set up to increase trade of goods, as local merchants were unwilling to sell small quantities of goods. They preferred to sell at least a bushel at a time. The Corn Exchange also allowed merchants to sample goods before purchasing them.

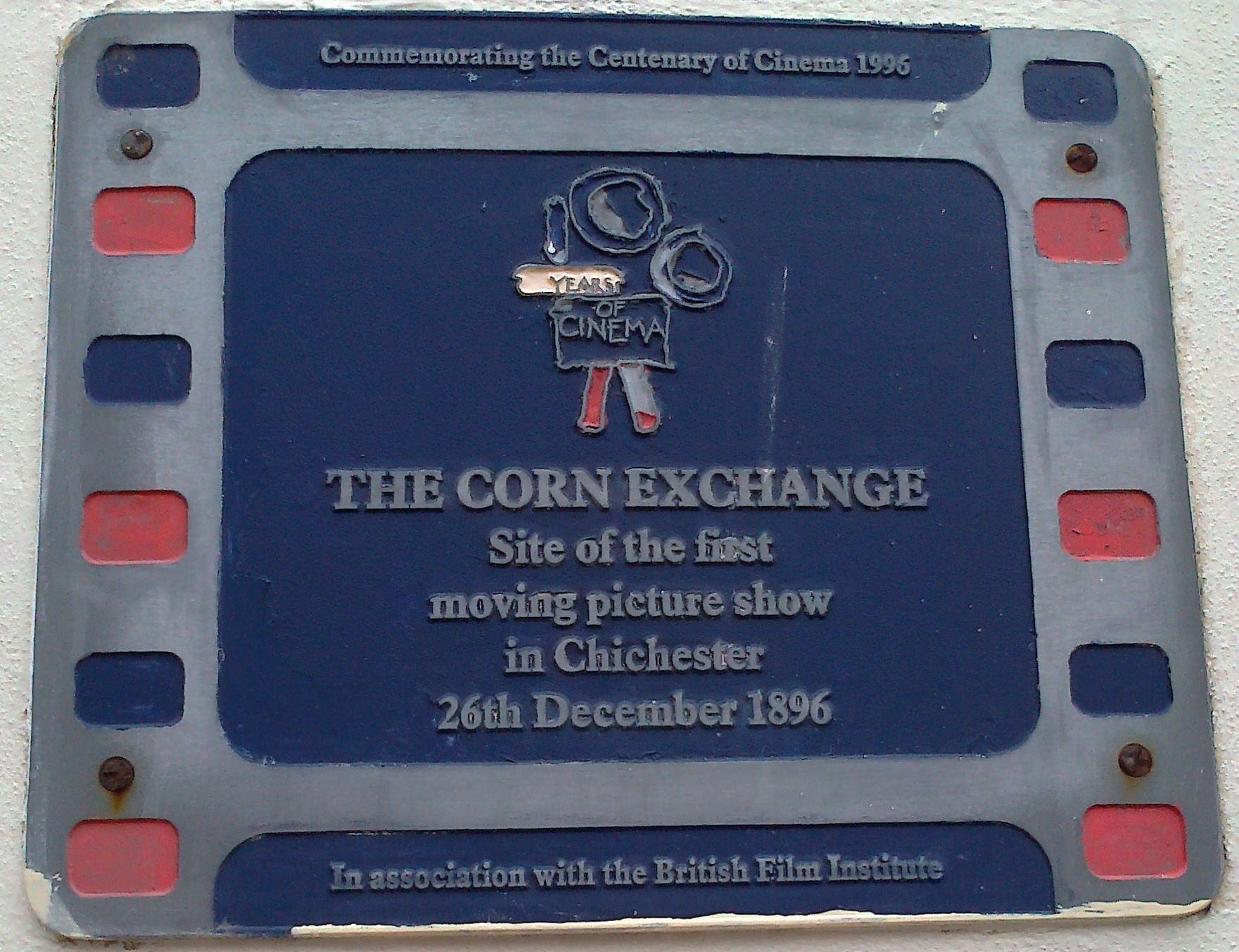
Blue plaque at the Corn Exchange.

The use of the building as a corn exchange declined significantly in the wake of the Great Depression of British Agriculture in the late 19th century. However, from the 1880s, parts of the Corn Exchange were rented out as a cinema. It was one of Chichester's first cinemas, and the Corn Exchange has a blue plaque commemorating this. In 1922 the Corn Exchange became a full-time cinema, and the following year, the cinema was purchased by London and District Cinemas. In 1927 the cinema was renovated, and was renamed the Exchange Cinema. The Kid Brother was the first film shown at the renovated cinema.

The company which had originally commissioned the corn exchange was wound up in 1948 and, that same year, Granada cinemas took over the Corn Exchange, and named it the Granada Exchange. The Granada cinema closed in 1980. Star Wars film The Empire Strikes Back was the last film shown at the Granada cinema. The Corn Exchange was then left unused for six years, before being leased to McDonald's, who used it until 2004.

Part of the Corn Exchange is currently leased to Next. In 2018 Next said that they were looking to close their Chichester Corn Exchange store. Other companies that have been based in the Corn Exchange include the Boston Tea Party café chain, a Grape Tree health food store, and two Indian restaurants.

To the rear stood a three-storey corn store built of red and grey brick. This was modified and converted into offices in 1967. Another corn store designed in 1871 by architect John Elkington, this time of stone with brick dressings, was similarly converted in the early 1980s.

== Architecture ==
The building is Greek Revivalist in style. Across the front of the building are six Doric columns, each of which weigh 3 tonnes and are made of cast iron. They form a "noble hexastyle portico" which projects on to the pavement and rests on six substantial stone bases. There are four smaller columns behind it. These support a large pediment and decorative entablature which runs around the side elevations of the building.

== See also ==
- Corn exchanges in England
- Grade II* listed buildings in West Sussex
