= Plaza Theatre =

Plaza Theatre or Plaza Theater may refer to:

== Australia ==
- Plaza Theatre, Adelaide, a former theatre in Adelaide, South Australia, now demolished
- Plaza Theatre, Paddington, Brisbane, Queensland, a cinema built from 1929, now known as Empire Revival
- Plaza Theatre, Perth, Western Australia, a cinema opened in 1937
- Plaza Theatre, Sydney, New South Wales, a former theatre, now heritage-listed building

== India ==
- Plaza Theatre (Bangalore)

== United States ==
- Plaza Theater (Tucson), Arizona
- Plaza Theatre (Palm Springs), California
- Plaza Theatre (Atlanta), Georgia
- Plaza Theatre (El Paso), Texas
- Plaza Theatre Company, Cleburne, Texas
- Plaza Theatre (Charleston, West Virginia), a historic building
- Plaza Theatre (New York City), New York

== See also ==
- Plaza Cinema (disambiguation)
