= Sloe Fair =

Annual travelling funfair held in Chichester, West Sussex

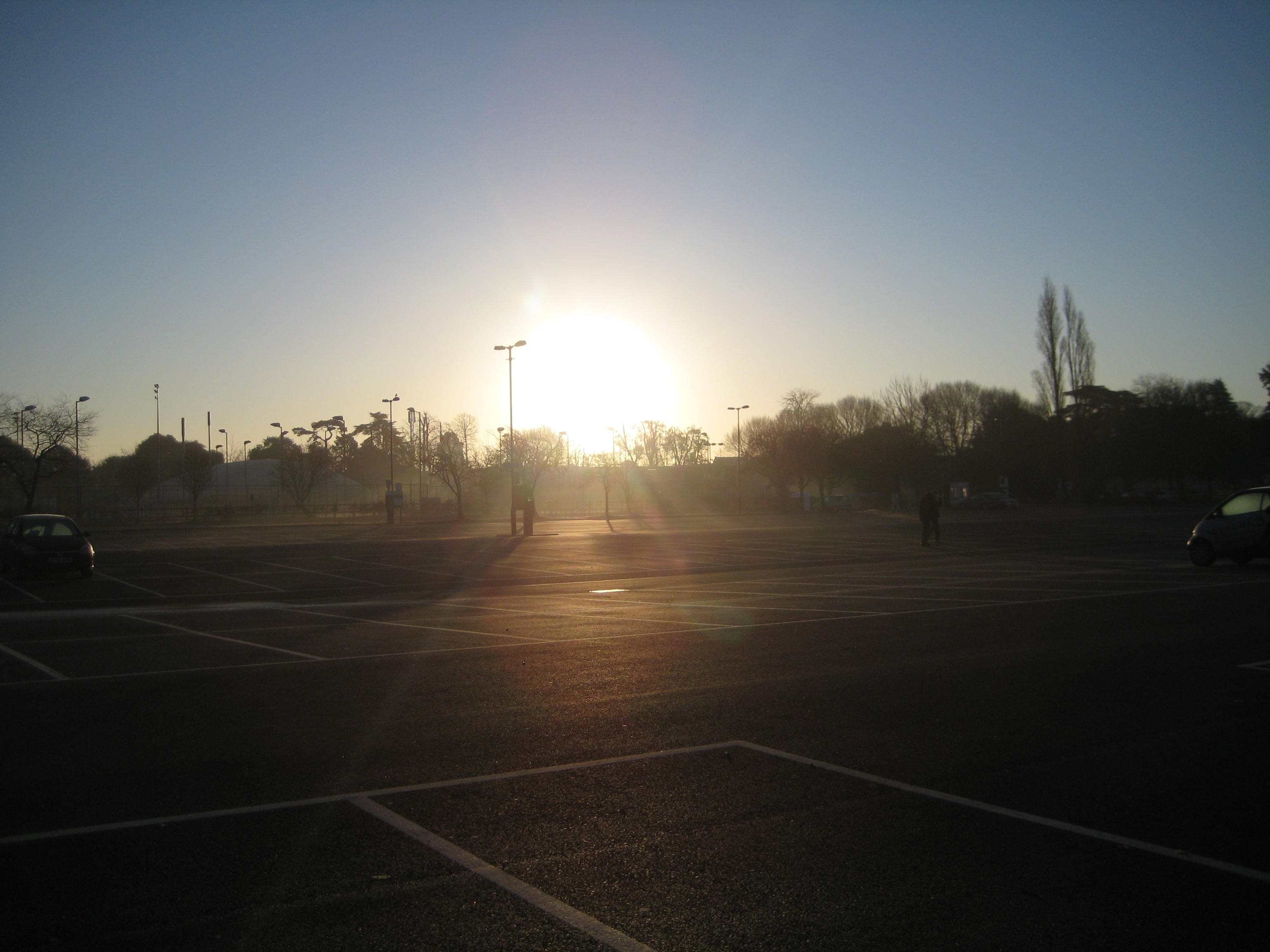
- Northgate car park (Sloe Field) in 2010
- Genre: Fairground, funfair
- Frequency: Annual
- Locations: Chichester, United Kingdom
- Years active: 918–919 years
- Inaugurated: 1107 (Royal Charter)
- Founder: Ralph de Luffa
- Next event: 20 October 2027

The Sloe Fair is a travelling funfair that is held annually on 20 October at Northgate carpark in Chichester, West Sussex. The fair was first held in 1107 or 1108 after King Henry I of the Kingdom of England granted Ralph de Luffa, Bishop of Chichester, the right to hold a fair for a period of eight days from a date of de Luffa's choosing. The fair was originally chosen to coincide with the Feast of Saint Faith the Virgin on 6 October, a Gallo-Romano saint with a strong following in the area, but in 1207 a license was awarded for the fair to be held several days later, on the Vigil of the Feast of the Holy Trinity and the eight days thereafter. It is, however, unclear whether the date of the fair was actually changed, and according to records held in the library of Chichester Cathedral, as late as the 18th Century the Court of Piepowders that was held on the occasion of the fair took place between the Feast of Saint Faith and the Eve of Saint Edward the Confessor, on 12 October. The name "Sloe Fair" is believed to be a reference to a sloe tree that grew on the original site of the fair, in a field just outside Chichester's North Gate.

In its heyday, the fair attracted traders and visitors from across Southern England. Though the specific form of the event has changed over the centuries, the Sloe Fair continues to be held in the modern era. The Sloe Fair was not held during World War II and during the hostilities a caravan was placed at the site at which the fair is held, to prevent the right to hold a fair from lapsing. The modern Sloe Fair is organized by the Showmen's Guild of Great Britain and the main attractions are mechanical fairground rides. In 2009, it was reported in the local press that the Showmens' Guild's right to hold the Sloe Fair stood in the way of proposals to construct a multi-storey car park on the site of Northgate carpark, where the fair is held.

In 2020 the Sloe Fair was not held for the first time since World War 2 with the exception of a small non-operating ride due to a walk in by appointment COVID-19 test centre being put in the car park.
