= Litten Gardens =

Public park in Chichester, West Sussex, England

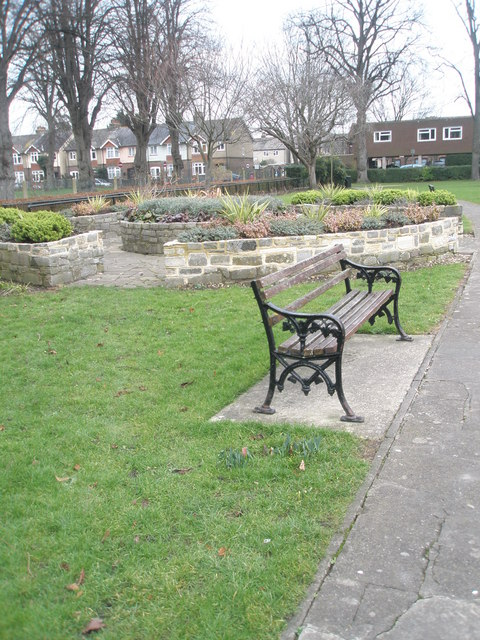
- Empty bench in Litten Gardens in January 2009

- Location within Chichester city centre
- Type: Public park
- Location: Chichester, West Sussex, England
- Coordinates: 50°50′18″N 0°46′20.5″W
- Owner: Chichester City Council

Litten Gardens is a public park in Chichester, West Sussex, England. The park is maintained by Chichester City Council. Chichester War Memorial is located within the park.

== History ==
In 2017, Chichester City Council took over maintenance of the park.

== Chichester War Memorial ==
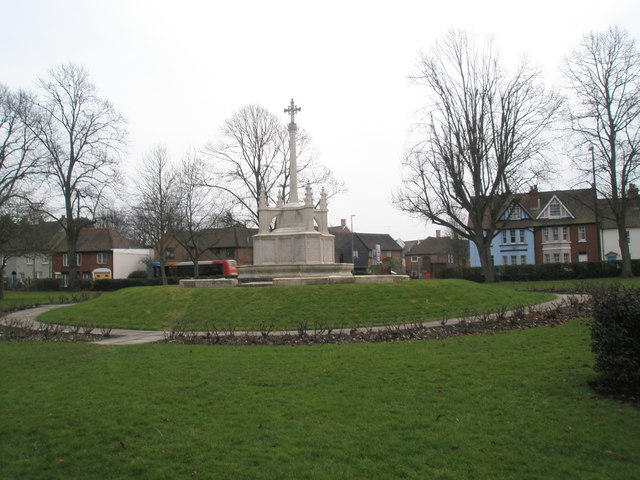
Photograph of the memorial in January 2009

In 1921, Sir William Robertson unveiled a war memorial in Eastgate Square, Chichester for soldiers who died in World War I (WWI). The memorial was relocated to Litten Gardens in 1940. Chichester City Council have subsequently added the names of soldiers who died in World War II (WWII). The memorial contains the names of 351 dead from WWI and 196 from WWII.

The war memorial was listed as a Grade II monument on 2 November 2015.

In March 2020, a resident noticed that a flower, ordinarily attached to the war memorial, had been pulled out and left on the ground. The act was described as vandalism by Chichester District Council.
