= Priory Park, Chichester =

Public park in Chichester, West Sussex, England

Priory Park
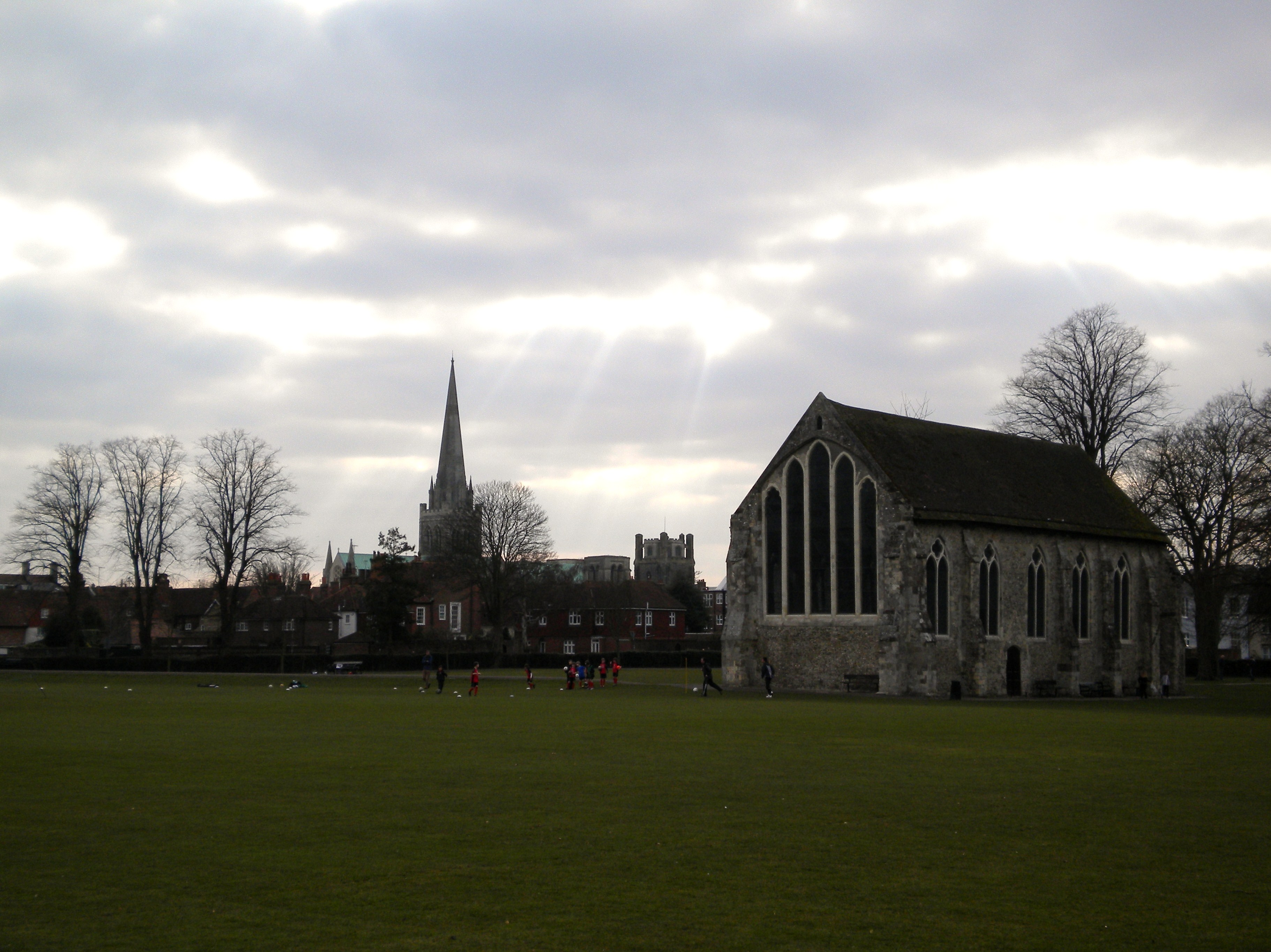
- View of Priory Park overlooking Chichester Cathedral

- Location within Chichester city centre
- Type: Public park
- Location: Chichester, West Sussex, England
- Coordinates: 50°50′21″N 0°46′34″W
- Established: 1918
- Operator: Chichester District Council
- Open: Year round during daylight

Priory Park is a public park in Chichester, West Sussex, England, operated by Chichester District Council. It is situated in the north-east quadrant of Chichester City centre. The park is bordered by the medieval city walls to the north and east which are built upon the original Roman foundations. The park contains Chichester Castle and the Guildhall.

== History ==
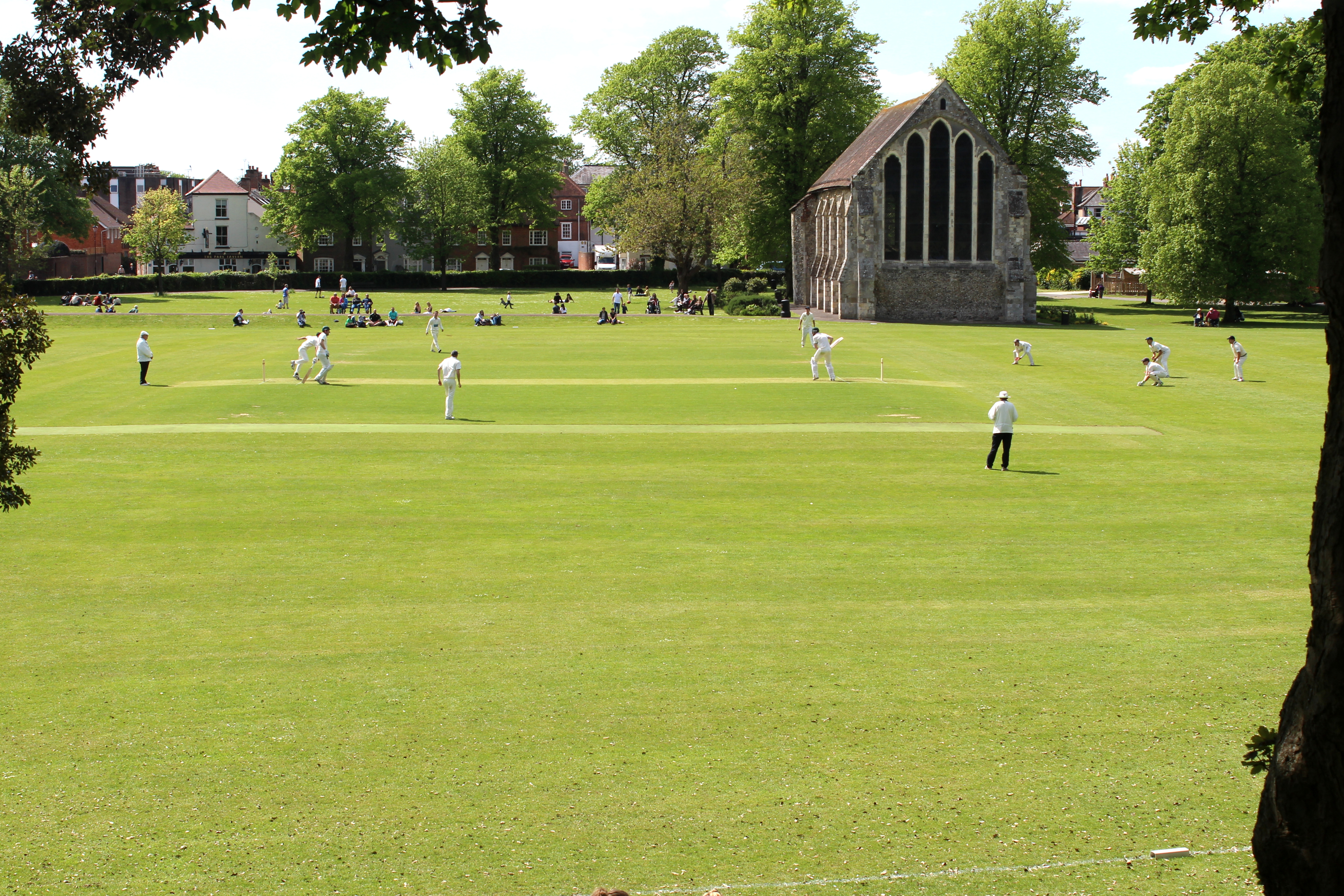
Sport Fields

Poet and artist William Blake was tried in the guildhall located in the park.

The park has also played host to county cricket matches, holding its first first-class match in 1852 (before the park itself was established) when Sussex played an All England Eleven.

In 1882 and 1886, the touring Australians played on the ground, although Sussex were not their opponents: they played Lord March's XI (owner of the nearby Goodwood Estate) and against a United Eleven.

It was in the Australians' match against the United Eleven that the great W.G. Grace played on the ground.

Having last played on the ground in 1852, Sussex returned there in 1906 playing a 1906 County Championship match against local rivals Hampshire. Sussex last played on the ground in 1950 against Glamorgan.

In May 2017, two Roman town houses were found underneath the park using Ground penetrating radar equipment. One of the houses included a hot room and baths.

== Present ==
Today the ground is used by Chichester Priory Park Cricket Club who play in the Sussex Cricket League Division Two.

Chichester City Colts Under 9's football team play here too, it is also known as 'The Fortress'.

== Gallery ==
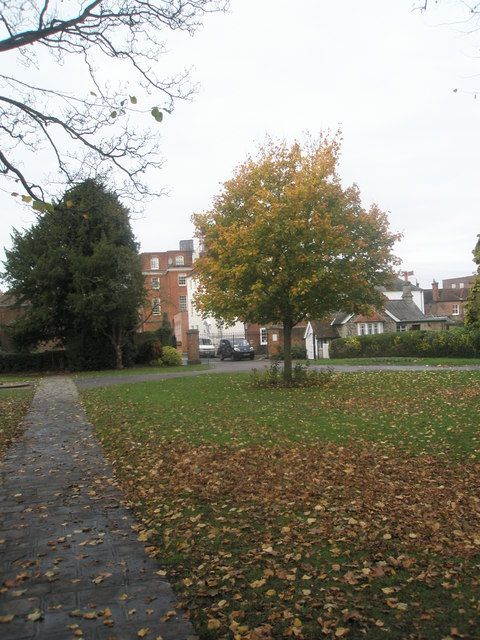
Park in Autumn

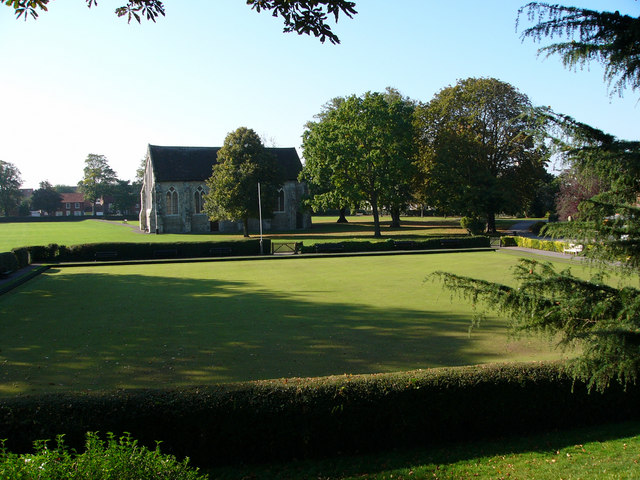
Bowling Green

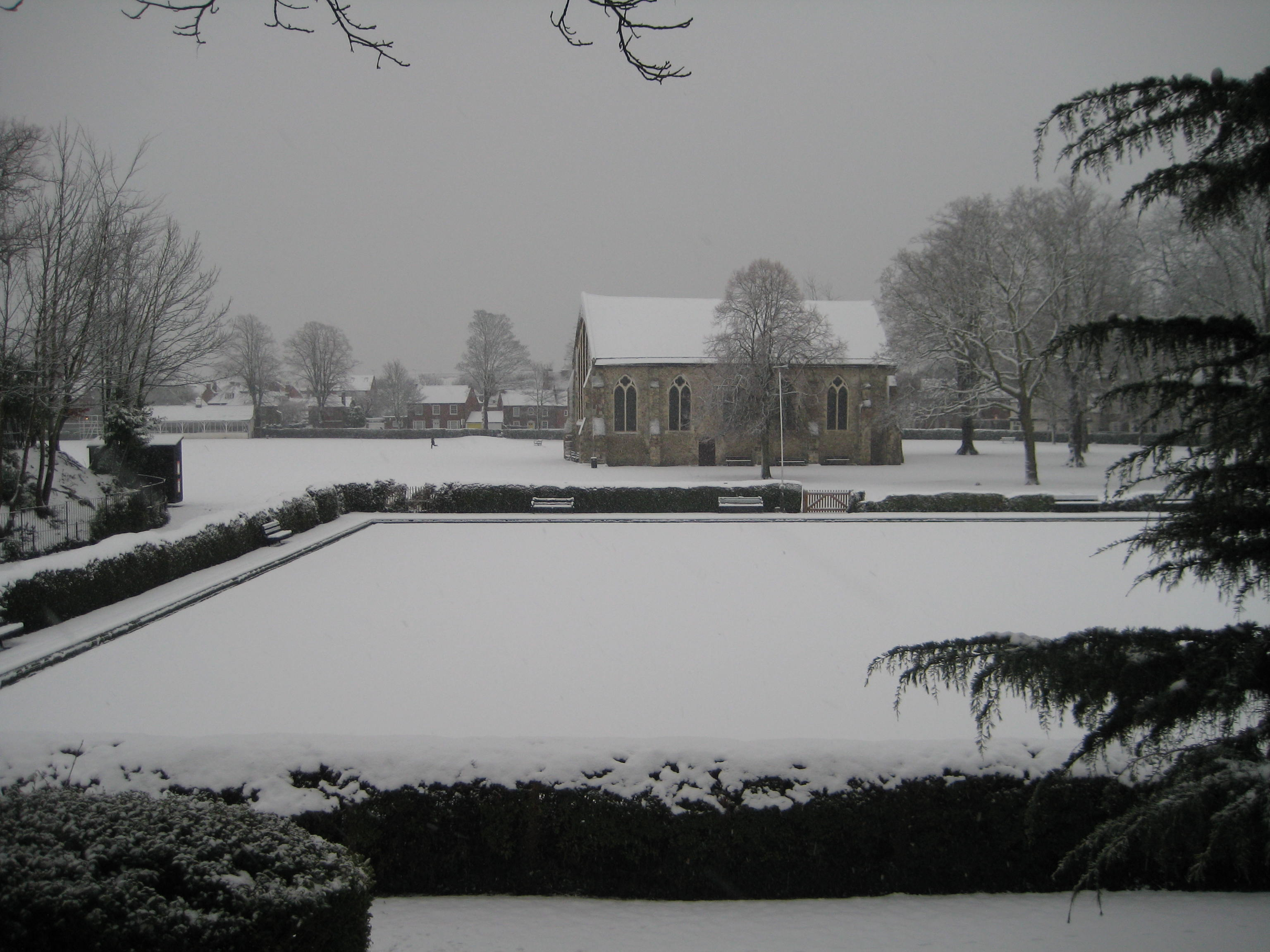
Park in snow

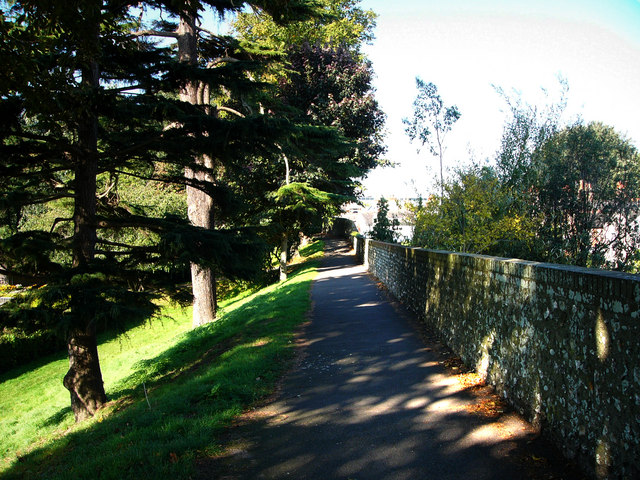
North walls
