= Chichester Guildhall =

Building in Chichester, West Sussex, England

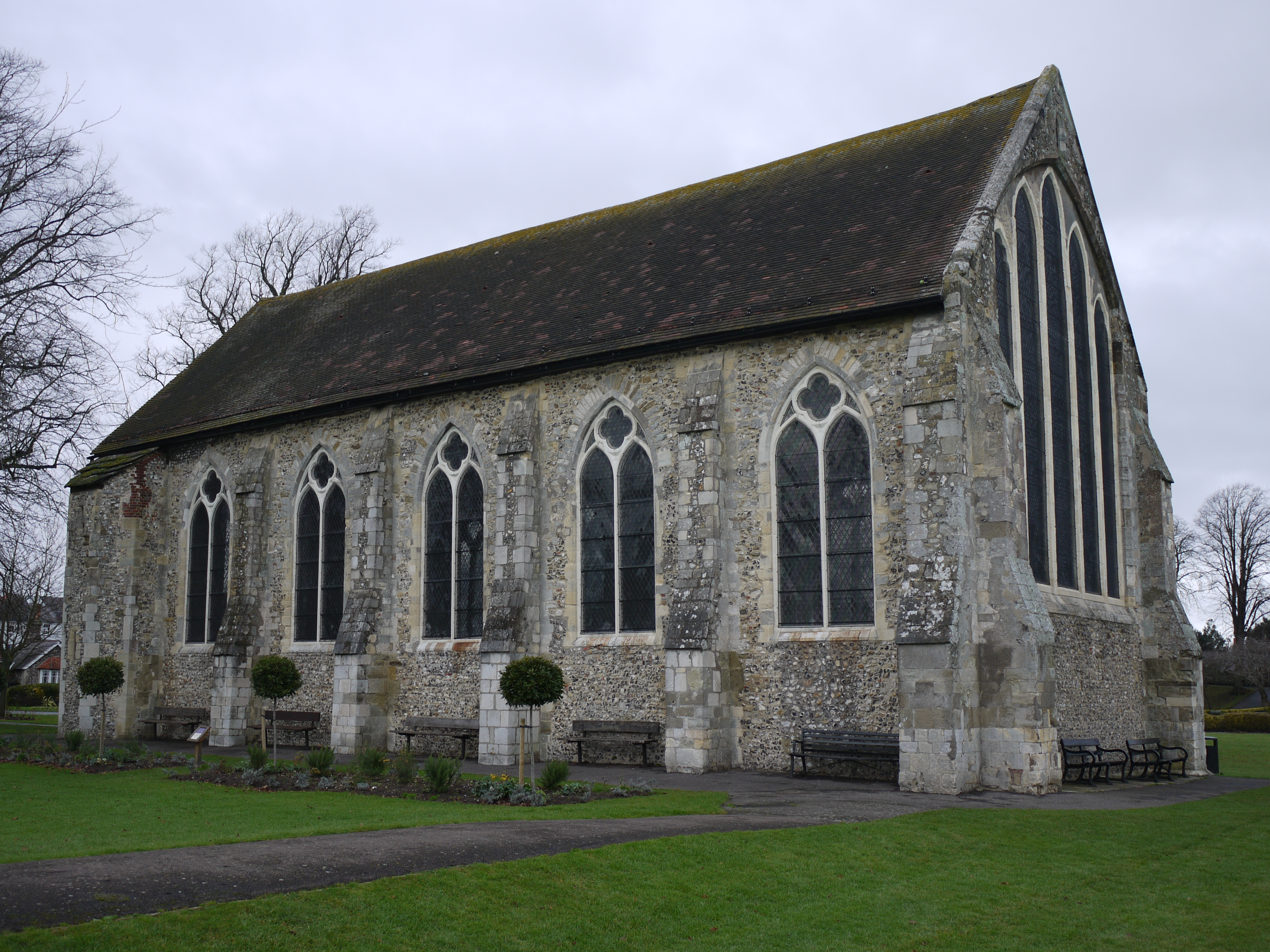

- Location of Chichester Guildhall
- 50.839213°N 0.776607°W
- Location: Priory Park, Chichester, West Sussex, England

History
- Built: 1270–80

Site notes
- Governing body: Chichester District Council

Scheduled monument
- Reference no.: 1185123

Chichester Guildhall is a building in Chichester, West Sussex, England. It was originally the chancel of a Franciscan friary church. The Franciscans (alias Grey Friars) received the land, now called Priory Park, in a grant from Richard, Earl of Cornwall, in 1269. It is a scheduled monument.

The first record of the building talks of an ordination held by Archbishop John Peckham, in 1283. This date ties in with the architectural features of the Guildhall. The building is a magnificent example of late 13th-century architecture and is one of the few friaries in England that is still roofed. The rest of the friary buildings were destroyed at the Dissolution in 1538.

The building is an aisle-less structure, 82 by 31 feet (25.0 by 9.4 m) with a height of 42 feet (13 m). The western wall was a later addition, leading to the belief that some portion on the nave must have at least been begun. This modification to the building was executed so as to allow the chancel arch to remain visible spanning the whole width of the structure. Symmetrical windows separated by buttresses line the northern and southern sides of the building. The windows have simple chamfers on the outside with no further mouldings.

== See also ==
- Guild
- Guildhall
- List of monastic houses in England
