= Boston Tea Party (café chain) =

British family-owned independent café group

Coordinates: 51.4551°N 2.6038°W

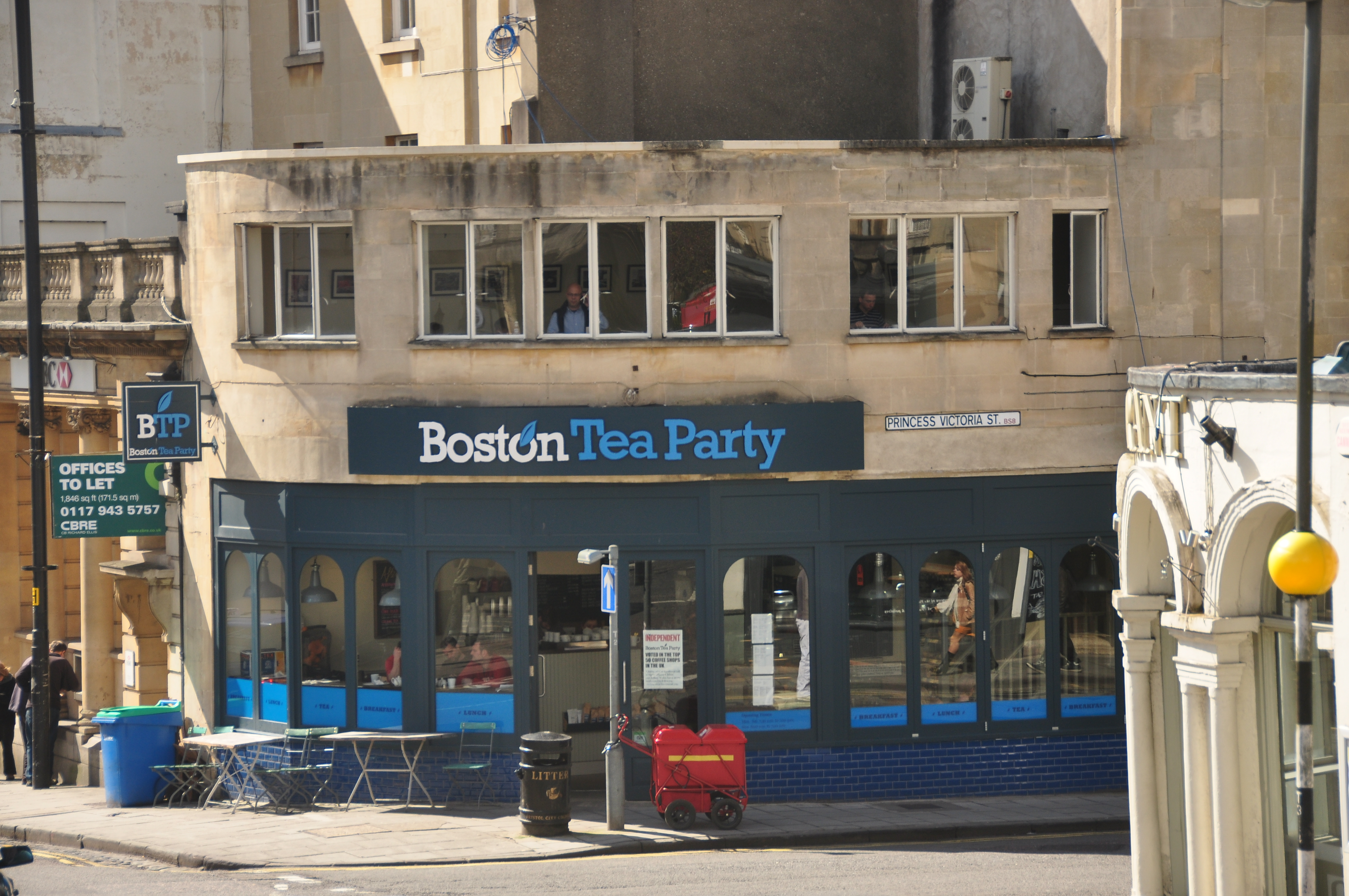
- A branch in Bristol
- Type: Private limited company
- Industry: Café
- Founded: 1995; 31 years ago in Bristol, England
- Headquarters: 75 Park Street, Bristol, England
- Key people: Sam Roberts (CEO)
- Products: Coffee beverages, tea, smoothies, ales, cooked meals, sandwiches
- Website: https://bostonteaparty.co.uk/

Boston Tea Party is a British family-owned independent café group headquartered at its first café in Park Street, Bristol, which was opened in 1995. The business has 21 cafés, predominantly in South West England.

== Sustainability ==
On 1 June 2018, the company was the first coffee chain in the world to stop issuing single-use coffee cups in response to the global plastic pollution crisis. The ban on coffee cups caused a 25% drop in the company's takeout sales, or £250,000, compared to £1 million annually previously. The owner of the company said "we are 100% committed and there's no going back."

All food is ethically sourced from sustainable resources.

== Awards ==
In 2015, Boston Tea Party won the award for Best Café in Food Magazine and Best chain café in Café Life. In the same year, it was also nominated for the Society, Large Group and Innovation awards at the Sustainable Restaurant Awards.

In 2016, Boston Tea Party was featured on the Food Made Good Awards shortlist, as announced by The Independent. The recognition highlighted the café chain's innovative and fun approach to sustainability.

In 2018, Boston Tea Party was rated as the Most Ethical Coffee Shop in Britain by Ethical Consumer because all of its ingredients are sourced from sustainable resources and meet ethical sourcing standards.

== See also ==
- List of coffeehouse chains
