= Oaklands Park, Chichester =

Public park in Chichester, West Sussex, England

Oaklands Park
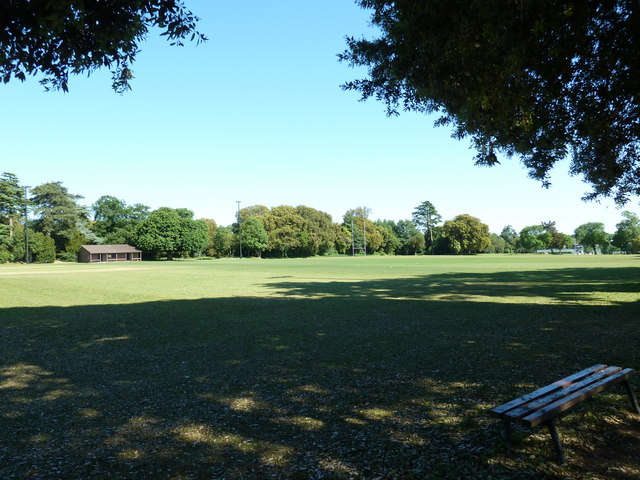
- Oaklands Park in June 2010

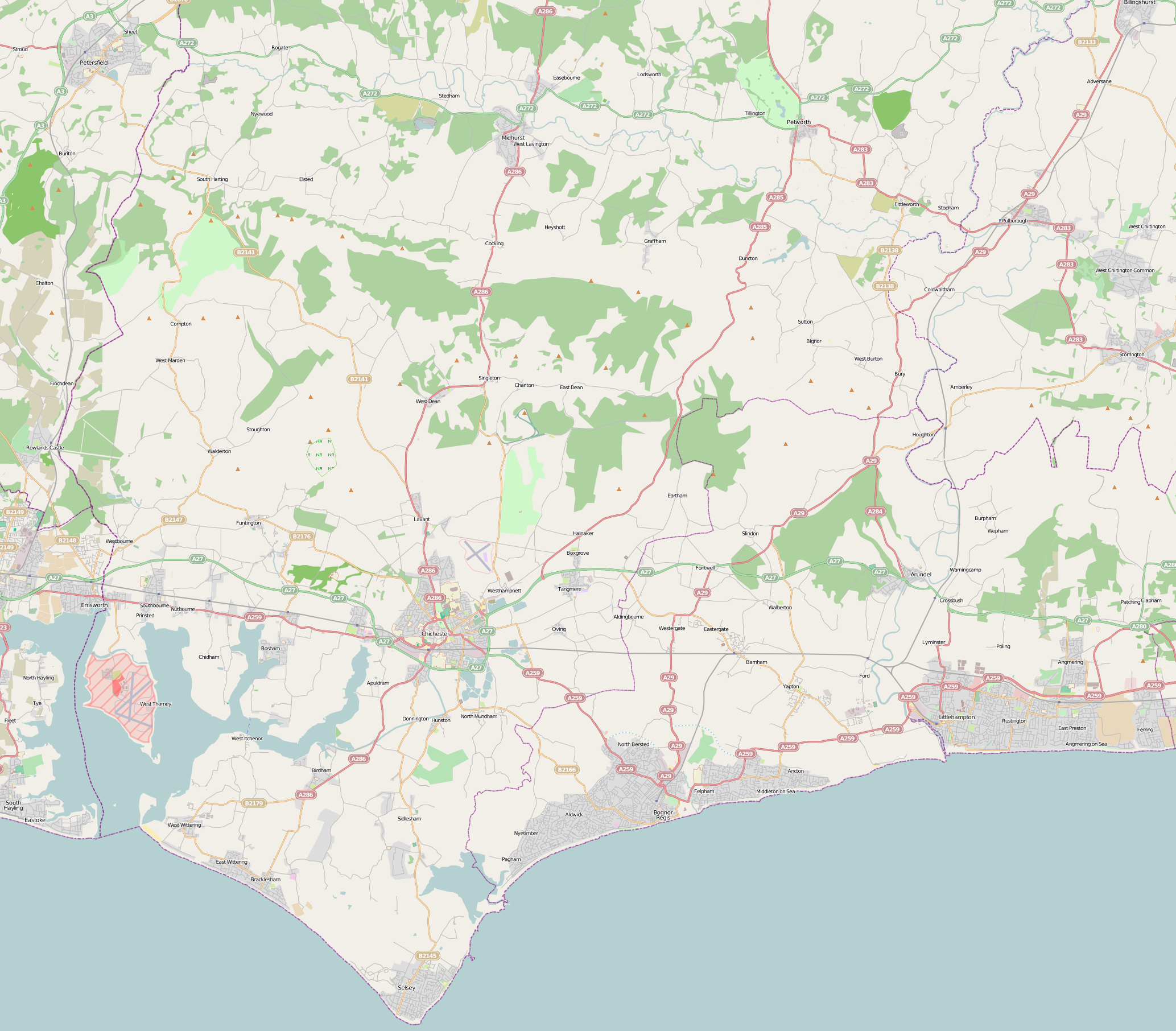
- Location within Chichester District
- Type: Public park
- Location: Chichester, West Sussex, England
- Coordinates: 50°50′36.6″N 0°46′34.6″W
- Area: c.10 acres
- Created: 1939; 87 years ago
- Owner: Chichester District Council

Oaklands Park is a public park in Chichester, West Sussex, England.

== History ==
In 1939, Chichester City Council purchased the c.10 acres of land for the park for the sum of £11,000.

In 2006, a clubhouse for the Chichester Rifle and Pistol Club was constructed in the park.

In November 2011, a community orchard was planted.

In March 2021, a vigil was held in the park for Sarah Everard.

== Leisure ==
=== Sports ===
The park contains 4 rugby pitches, a football pitch, a softball pitch, a pavilion, and a cricket pitch.

Chichester City F.C. are based at the park.

=== Culture ===
Chichester Festival Theatre is located in south end of the park

== Gallery ==
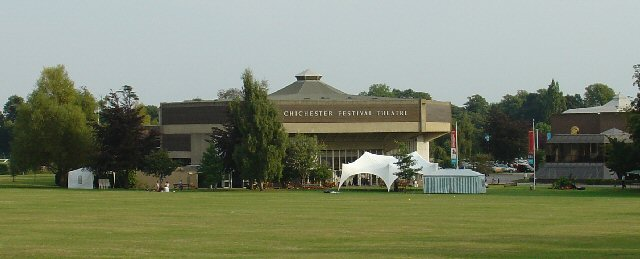
Chichester Festival Theatre, located in the park

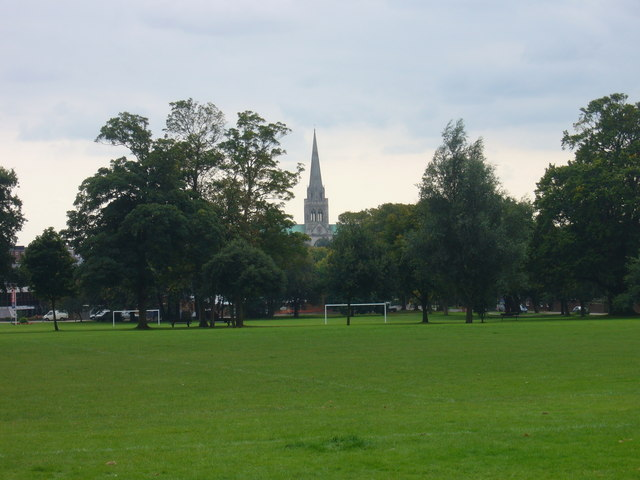
Playing field in the park

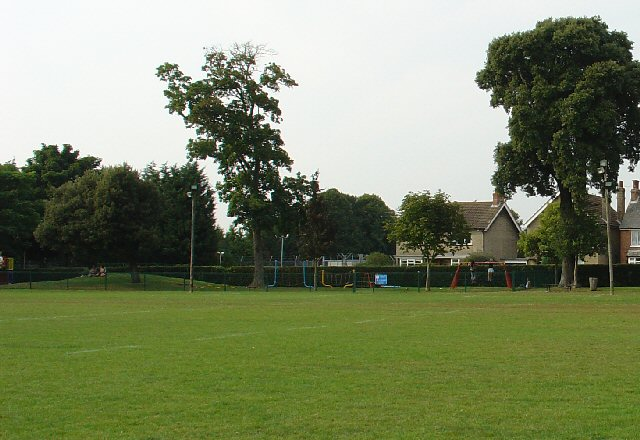
Play area at the North end of the park

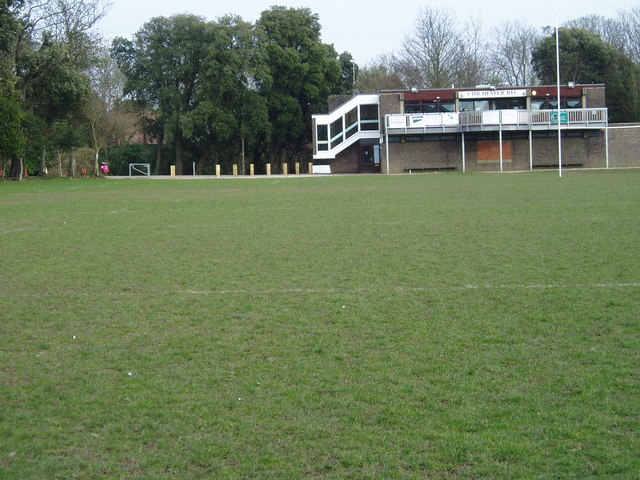
Chichester RFC clubhouse, located in the park
