= Plaza Theatre Company =

Plaza Theatre Company was formed under the Cleburne Performing Arts Foundation as a non-profit community theater located in Cleburne, Texas. The Cleburne Performing Arts Foundation was created by members of the Downtown Cleburne Association in 2006. The company's first production was You're a Good Man, Charlie Brown, which opened the evening of April 26, 2007. The Plaza Theatre Company's production of Enchanted April was recognized as Best Play - Non-Equity in the Dallas–Fort Worth metroplex at the 2015 Column Awards.

Plaza Theatre Company presents light comedies and musicals that are designed for the entire family. Shows run nearly every Thursday, Friday, and Saturday at 7:30 pm with matinees playing on Saturdays at 3:00 pm. Plaza operates as a community theater involving volunteers both on stage and behind-the-scenes. The Company has put on over 100 mainstage productions since its first production in 2007 and is currently in its 15th season.

Plaza Theatre Company is also the parent company of the offshoot Plaza Academy, which operates as a Musical Theatre and Dance school for young people. The Academy offers classes at the Plaza Academy Fine Arts & Dance Studio located at 221 S. Mill Street in Cleburne, TX. The Academy started in 2008 working inside what is now called Plaza Main Street Theatre and then moved into its current facility in January 2012.

In 2010, Plaza Theatre Company was voted the best theatre company in North Texas by voters of the WFAA A-List.

== Location ==
In February 2018, Plaza Theatre Company moved from 111 South Main St., Cleburne, Texas to their new facility called Dudley Hall (located at 305 S. Anglin St., Cleburne, Texas). The main street location now houses Plaza Jr., where young performers solely act in productions. Box office hours are from 10 am to 6 pm daily except Sunday.

== Awards ==
- 2011 Column Awards: Best Musical of the Year: INTO THE WOODS
- 2013 Column Awards: Best Musical of the Year: RAGTIME
- 2015 Column Awards: Best Play of the Year: ENCHANTED APRIL
- 2016 Column Awards: Best Musical of the Year: THE ADDAMS FAMILY
- 2018 Column Awards: Best Play of the Year: TO KILL A MOCKINGBIRD
- 2019 Column Awards: Best Musical of the Year equity: ELTON JOHN AND TIM RICE'S AIDA
- 2019 Column Awards: Best Musical of the Year non-equity: NEWSIES
