= Plaza Cinema, Chichester =

Cinema in Chichester, England

Coordinates: 50.8352°N 0.7794°W

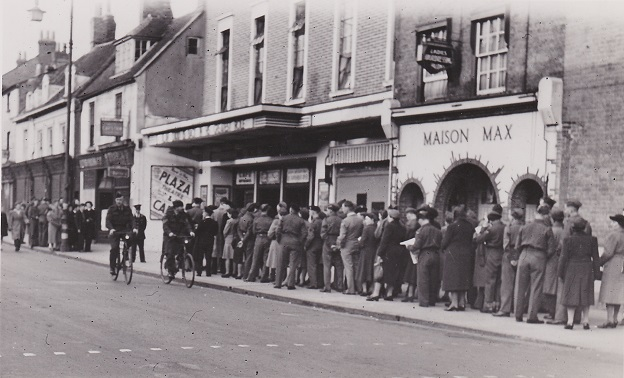
Plaza Cinema in early 1940s

The Plaza Cinema was a traditional cinema theatre at 55 South Street in Chichester, Sussex between 1920 and 1960.

The Art Deco cinema building was designed by Peter Dulvey Stonham. The theatre opened on 16 July 1920 as the Picturedrome showing silent movies. The cinema was renamed as the Plaza Cinema in 1929 and was fitted with a new sound system, after it was bought by County Cinemas. In 1936 the theatre was completely remodelled by architect Andrew Mather, with a new Georgian-style façade, a first floor restaurant, an Art Deco interior design, the addition of a balcony and an increased seating capacity of 1,063. It was reopened as the New Plaza on 18 December 1936. Odeon Theatres (part of The Rank Organisation) acquired the County Cinemas chain in 1939, although it continued as the Plaza Cinema until May 1945, when it was renamed as the Odeon. Toni Hunt was the cinema manager from 1935 to 1949. He arranged for Petula Clark to visit the Odeon on 2 September 1946 for the world premiere of her new film London Town.

Rank also owned the larger Gaumont cinema, which opened in 1937. Rank closed the Odeon cinema in February 1960.

The Odeon cinema building was converted into a Fine Fare supermarket in December 1960. The building is still in use as a supermarket, now operated by Iceland supermarket.
