= Tadeusz Isakowicz-Zaleski =

Polish Armenian Catholic priest and author (1956–2024)

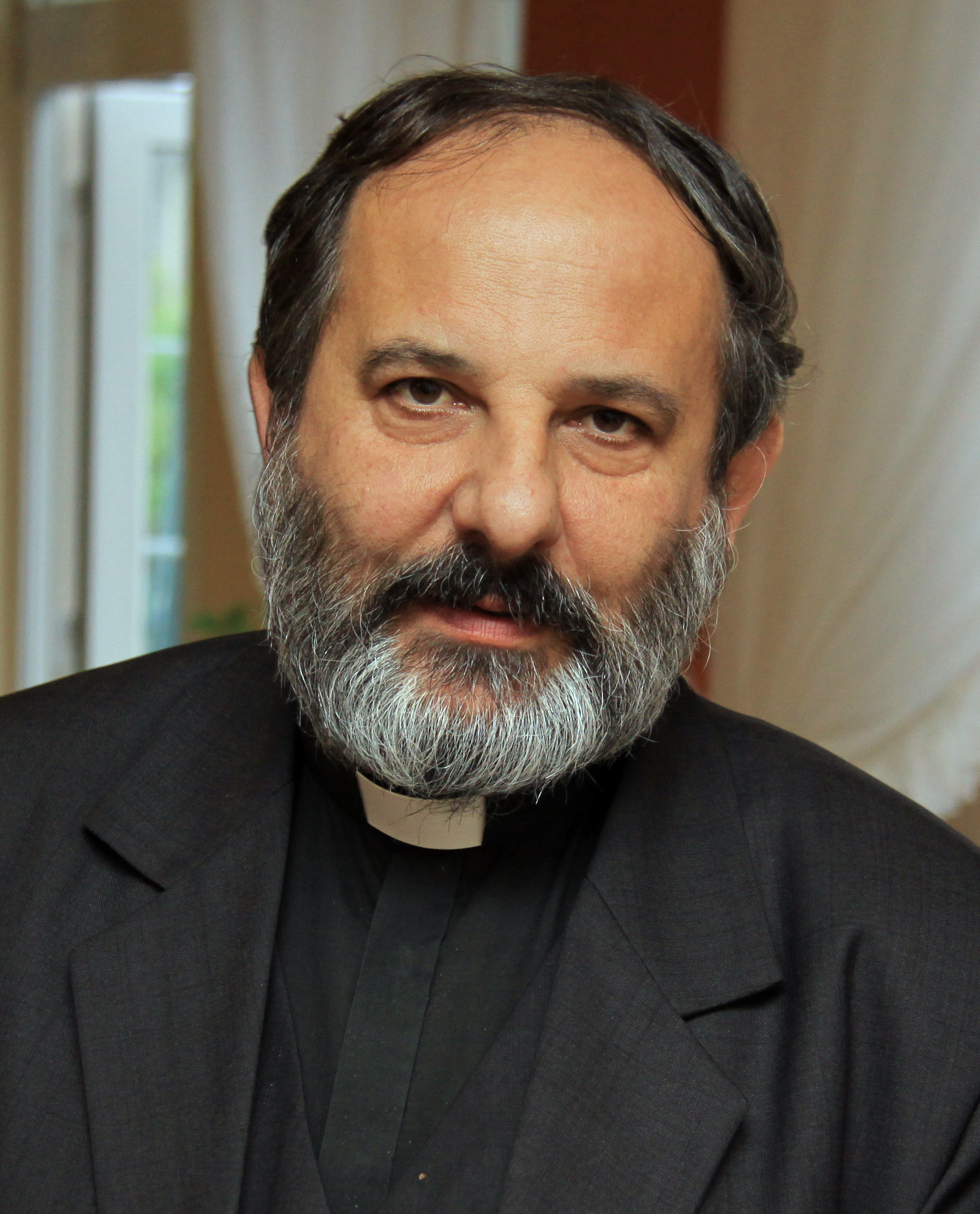
- Born: 7 September 1956; Kraków, Poland
- Died: 9 January 2024 (aged 67); Chrzanów, Poland
- Education: Papal Armenian Collegium, Rome

Ecclesiastical career
- Church: Roman Catholic; Armenian Catholic
- Ordained: 1983

Tadeusz Bohdan Isakowicz-Zaleski (Armenian: Թադևոս Վարդապետ Իսահակյան-Զալեսկի, romanized: Tadevos Vartapet Isahakian-Zaleski; 7 September 1956 – 9 January 2024) was a Polish Roman Catholic and Armenian Catholic priest, author and activist. He was a leader of the anticommunist student opposition in Kraków in the late 1970s, became a Solidarity chaplain in Kraków's Nowa Huta district in the 1980s, and later an avid supporter of the lustration of the Polish Church. On 3 May 2006, he was awarded the Commander's Cross of the Order of Polonia Restituta, one of Poland's highest orders. Subsequently, in 2007, he was awarded the Order of the Smile and the Polish Ombudsman's Order of Paweł Włodkowic.

In 1985, he was twice tortured by Poland's communist-era Security Service, and some twenty years later in 2006, he started researching the secret police archives kept by Poland's Institute of National Remembrance to discover that 39 Archdiocese of Kraków priests had collaborated with the regime between 1944 and 1989. This resulted in the much-publicized 'Church Spy scandal' in Poland, where till then the Polish Church was only known for its role in battling communism and preserving traditional and national values both during the partitions of Poland and in the communist era. Subsequently, in 2007 he published his controversial book Księża wobec bezpieki na przykładzie archidiecezji krakowskiej (lit. 'Priests towards the security services on the example of the Archdiocese of Kraków', but published in English under the title "Priests in the Face of the Security Services") on priests who cooperated with communist secret services. He is the subject of a documentary 'Poland's Turbulent Priest', shown on BBC World News in 2009, about his struggle with the communist regime and the Polish church.

== Life ==
Isakowicz-Zaleski was born in Kraków to a Polish father and an Armenian mother. Starting in his high school years, he was engaged in several Roman Catholic youth organizations. After graduating, he entered a seminary in his native city, which did not prevent him from being called for service in the Polish People's Army. He served in the years 1975–1977 in Brzeg. In the late 1970s, after returning to the seminary, he joined the anti-communist student movements, such as Student Committee of Solidarity. He co-published a Samizdat magazine Cross of Nowa Huta, also in 1977, he debuted in Tygodnik Powszechny with his poems.

In 1980, Isakowicz-Zaleski became engaged in the Solidarity movement; three years later he was ordained and chosen to continue studies at the Papal Armenian Collegium in Rome. During this period, he was not allowed to leave Communist Poland, because of his underground activities. Isakowicz-Zaleski began working in Kraków's district of Nowa Huta, where he celebrated Mass for the workers and for the fatherland in the Maximilian Kolbe parish in Mistrzejowice. Throughout the 1980s, he was repressed, and the Communist secret service agents twice brutally beat him. Both incidents happened in 1985, and came in the wake of the notorious 1984 murder of fellow Solidarity priest Jerzy Popiełuszko. The first attack occurred in April at his mother's home, where after gagging him the agents burned a V sign – the victory sign of the outlawed Solidarity trade union which he supported – on his chest with a cigarette. Later in December of the year, he was attacked again, this time at his presbytery. His ordeal was later used by Polish director Maciej Gawlikowski in his 2006 film To Intimidate the Priest.

In 1988, as a priest of the workers, he participated in the strike in Nowa Huta's Lenin Steel Mill. At the same time, he began helping the poor and the handicapped, together with nuns from local convents. In 1987, he co-founded the charitable Foundation of Brother Albert Chmielowski. He remained director of the Foundation, which owns a shelter in the village of Radwanowice in the suburbs of Kraków.

In 2006, after months of research at the Institute of National Remembrance, he drafted a book on the collaboration between Catholic priests and government agents. However, Cardinal Stanislaw Dziwisz denied him permission to publish it, unless it was vetted in advance by archdiocesan officials. On 3 May 2006, Father Zaleski was awarded one of Poland's highest Orders, the Polonia Restituta (Order of Restored Poland) by President Lech Kaczyński. In November 2006, he received an apology from the nation's Catholic primate, Cardinal Józef Glemp of Warsaw, for earlier criticizing his research into collaboration between the clergy and the Communist-era secret police.

In February 2007, he published Księża wobec bezpieki na przykładzie archidiecezji krakowskiej (lit. 'Polish Priests and the Communist Secret Police'), a book on priests who cooperated with communist secret services.

On 9 January 2024, Isakowicz-Zaleski died in a Chrzanów hospital. He was 67.

== Activities ==
=== Armenian Community in Poland ===
Reverend Isakowicz-Zaleski was a pastor of Armenian Catholic parish in Gliwice since 1 December 2009. Between 2001 and 2009 he was the national clergyman and national chaplain of the Armenian community of Poland. He popularized knowledge about the history and culture of Armenia itself, as well as about the history of the Armenian minority in Poland. He initiated cooperation between older and newer waves of Armenian immigrants. Father Isakowicz-Zaleski, who was related to the Catholic Armenian Rite archbishop of Lviv, Izaak Mikolaj Isakowicz, also promoted the erection of a monument in Kraków to commemorate the Armenian genocide.

=== Charity and Helping the Disabled ===
In 1997, Archbishop Franciszek Macharski named Isakowicz-Zaleski honorary canon of the Kraków Archdiocese to appreciate his charity-related activities. However, Isakowicz-Zaleski, who is known in Kraków for his charity works, resigned from this post in 2006, protesting allegations aimed at him. Together with Janina Ochojska, he was a participant in several humanitarian convoys to such countries as the former Yugoslavia, Albania, Chechnya and Ukraine. In September 2007, Polish Ombudsman awarded him the Order of Pawel Wlodkowic for courage in fighting for basic values and truths, against the opinions of the majority. He was also awarded the Order of the Smile. Since 2007, he has been cooperating with the Gazeta Polska weekly. Isakowicz-Zaleski ran the Brother Albert Foundation.

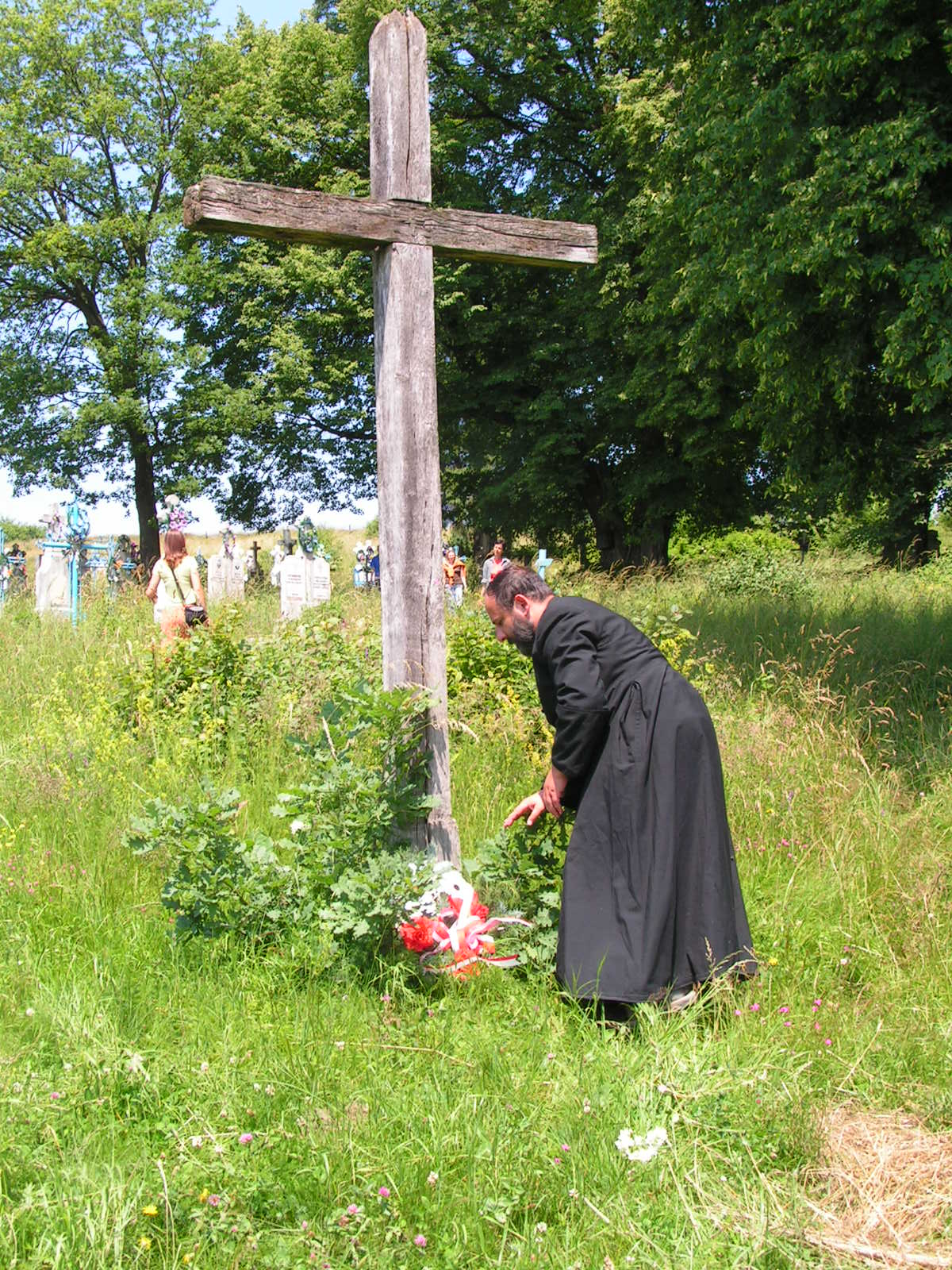
Ks. Isakowicz-Zaleski under the cross dedicated in honour of Poles murdered by the UPA in Korosciatyn

=== Massacres of Poles in Volhynia ===
Zaleski, who lost several members of his family in a campaign of ethnic cleansing of Poles in modern Western Ukraine (formerly inside pre-1939 eastern Polish territory), campaigned for many years to commemorate the Polish victims. In 2008 he unsuccessfully appealed to the Government of Poland to officially condemn the Volhynian Genocide. He stated that political correctness in Poland makes it impossible to mention these tragic events. In 2008 he wrote the book Subdued Genocide in Kresy, in which, among other things, he described the fate of his family and of the village of Korosciatyn near Monasterzyska (area of Ternopil), which was destroyed by Ukrainian nationalists, and its inhabitants murdered. He frequently criticized not only members of the Polish Government, together with President Kaczynski but also Roman Catholic hierarchy, such as Primate Józef Glemp and Cardinal Stanisław Dziwisz, claiming that they neglected the sufferings of Poles in Western Ukraine and they did not protest when Ukrainian nationalists are awarded orders.

== Lustration of Polish Clergy ==
In 2005, during the 25th Anniversary Celebrations of Solidarity, Zaleski was tipped off that there was a pre-1989 secret police file on him in Kraków. By then, under new Polish law, one could view one's own file, as well as those who informed on you. He sought permission from the IPN (Institute of National Remembrance) to study the documents. Subsequently, he found some five hundred pages of material on himself alone, names of fellow priests who had allegedly spied on him, and also a video of himself being gagged and beaten by thugs. He was swiftly able to identify several clergymen who had informed on him. Most crucially, evidence suggested that four figures who had risen to bishop status by 2005 were themselves past informers.

In February 2006, Zaleski came up with the idea of revealing the names of priests from the Archdiocese of Kraków who had been secret informers of the Communist secret service. As he had been victimized by Communist agents, he obtained access to his files, kept by the Institute of National Remembrance, as an injured party. Thus, he appealed publicly for all the priests who had served as secret agents for the Security Service to step forward and reveal themselves, causing a furore.

In August of the same year, Zaleski revealed that he had sent letters to priests registered as secret collaborators. His activities were harshly criticized by the Kraków Curia and Zaleski received an order from his superiors to refrain from making public statements about this subject. Cardinal Stanisław Dziwisz stated that Isakowicz-Zaleski had received a permit to conduct research exclusively into the repression that he himself faced under communism. Dziwisz condemned his "irresponsible and harmful" activities in a public letter, warned him to stop "throwing accusations", and finally ordered him to be silent. Eventually Dziwisz gave his permission for Zaleski to notify the clergymen before he identified them and allowed them to comment.

Nevertheless, Zaleski persisted saying that the church "must repent for the misdeeds of compromised priests". He told the Wprost Weekly, that in the fall of 2006 he was in a personal crisis and considered resigning from the priesthood. His research in the secret police files showed that 39 Kraków priests had collaborated with the regime. Four of them were now bishops. "The whole tragedy is that the church had 16 years to take care of the problem, and it didn't do a thing", stated Zaleski, adding that the Church "didn't want to hurt the pope, but actually, more harm was done by keeping silent".

On 28 February 2007, Znak publishing house issued Zaleski's book Księża wobec bezpieki na przykładzie archidiecezji krakowskiej (Polish Priests and the Communist Secret Police, ISBN 978-83-240-0803-2), in which he addressed the topic of the extent to which Poland's Roman Catholic Church was infiltrated by communist security. In November, Zaleski was awarded the Prize of Józef Mackiewicz. The book sparked huge public attention, with people signing up at bookstores to make sure they would get a copy. Zaleski decided to donate the royalties to charity.

== Publications ==
- "Oblezenie" (Siege, 1981) – poems, published as samizdat under pseudonym Jacek Partyka
- "Wspomnienia" (Recolletions, 1985) – poems, published as samizdat under pseudonym Jan Kresowiak
- "Morze Czerwone" (Red Sea, 1988) – poems, published as samizdat under pseudonym Jan Kresowiak
- "Slownik biograficzny ksiezy ormianskich i pochodzenia ormianskiego w Polsce w latach 1750-2000" (Biographical Dictionary of Armenian Priests in Poland 1750–2000, 2001)
- "Arcybiskup ormianski Izaak Mikolaj Isakowicz "Zlotousty" : duszpasterz, spolecznik i patriota 1824-1901" (Armenian Archbishop Izaak Mikolaj Isakowicz, 2001)
- "Wiersze" (Poems, 2006)
- "Ksieza wobec bezpieki na przykladzie archidiecezji krakowskiej" (Polish Priests and the Communist Secret Police, 2007)
- "Moje zycie nielegalne" (My illegal life, 2008)
- "Przemilczane ludobojstwo na Kresach" (Subdued Genocide in Kresy 2008)

== See also ==
- Lustration in Poland
- Sluzba Bezpieczenstwa
- Massacres of Poles in Volhynia
