= Kazimierz Rymut =

Polish linguist

- Born: December 18, 1935; Chechły
- Died: November 14, 2006 (aged 70); Kraków
- Occupations: linguist, onomastician

Kazimierz Rymut (18 December 1935 in Chechły near Ropczyce - 14 November 2006, Kraków) was a Polish linguist, onomastician. His area of expertise was the etymology of towns and geographical features in Poland.

== Biography ==
He studied Polish studies at the Jagiellonian University; He got his doctorate in 1968, habilitated in 1972. From 1979, he worked as an associate professor. He was long-standing director the Polish Onomastics Department at the Institute of the Polish Language of the Polish Academy of Sciences in Krakow, the editor-in-chief of the "Onomastica" magazine, chairman of the Slavonic Onomastic Commission in the International Committee of Slavs, and in the years 1986–2004 the chairman of the Commission for Determining the Names of Places and Physiographic Objects at the Ministry of Internal Affairs and Administration. He was buried at the cemetery in Brzezie on November 17, 2006.

== Works ==
- Nazwy miejscowe północnej części dawnego woj. krakowskiego, 1967
- Patronimiczne nazwy miejscowe w Małopolsce,1971
- Słowotwórstwo polskich patronimicznych nazw miejscowych z przyrostkiem (ov)itjo- na tle zachodniosłowiańskim, 1973
- Hydronimia dorzecza Orawy (together with M. Majtán), 1985
- Nazwy miejscowe Polski – słownik nazw miejscowych Polski,
- Nazwy miast Polski – słownik nazw miast Polski, 1987
- Nazwiska Polaków. Słownik historyczno-etymologiczny, 1991
