= Johann von Hoverbeck =

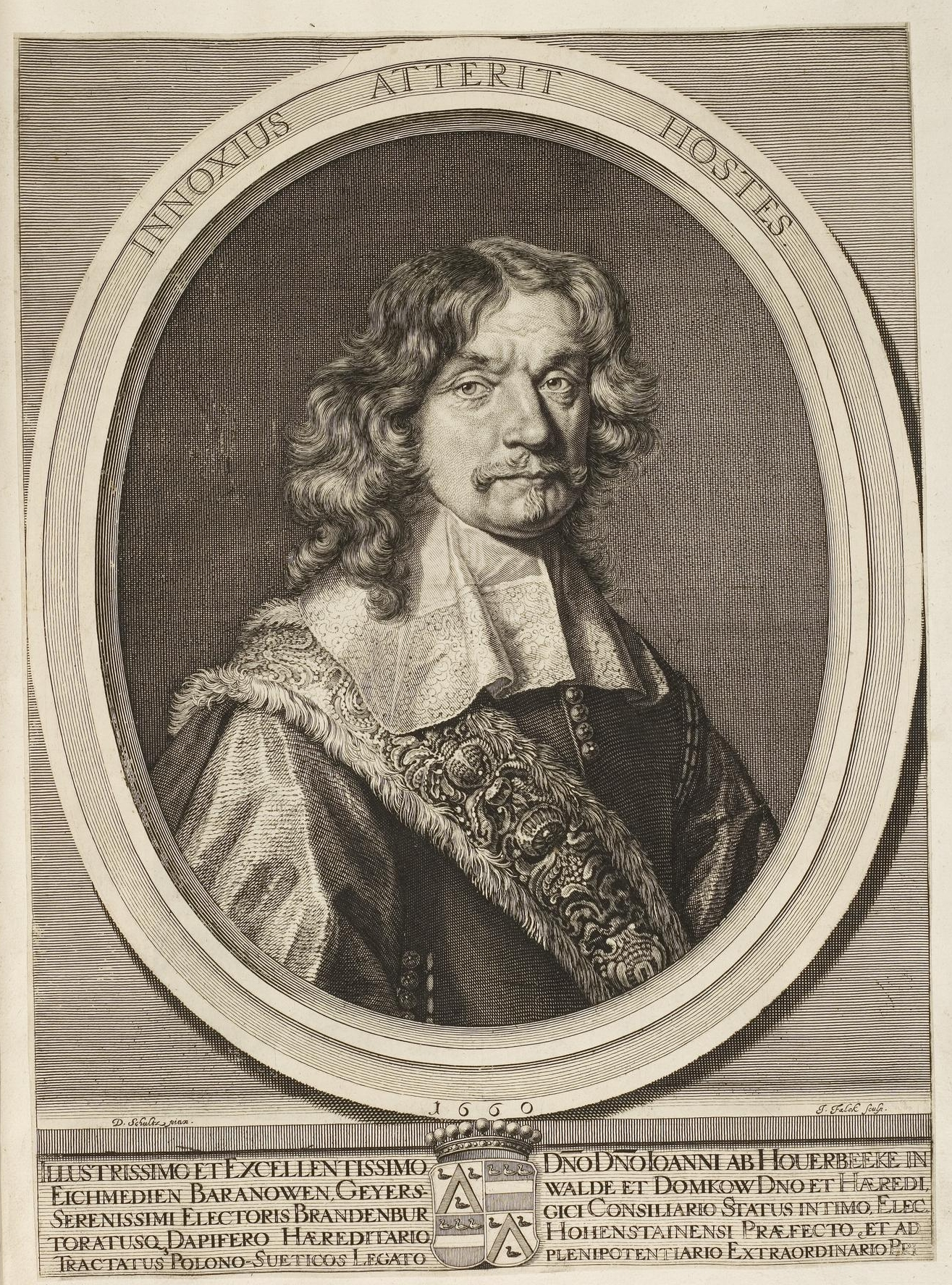
Johann von Hoverbeck, 1660

Johann von Hoverbeck (1 December 1606 – 6 April 1682) was a Prussian diplomat. Hoverbeck's parents were Nikolaus von Hoverbeck, a derivative of a Flemish noble family, who emigrated in 1570 from Brabant to the Margraviate of Brandenburg, and Ursula Gutteter-Dobrodziejski, a derivative from a patrician family in Kraków. Johann von Hoverbeck, born in Aleksandrowice, a manor in the vicinity of Kraków, since 1614 attended the high school in Danzig (Gdańsk). Since 1624 he undertook an extended educational journey through Europe and visited France (Paris, University of Sedan), the Netherlands, England (University of Oxford, London), Italy and Hungary. He returned home in June, 1630. In 1631 he took up duties in governmental services of Brandenburg and dealt with foreign affairs, especially concerning Poland. He was an envoy of Brandenburg-Prussia in Poland from 1631 to 1682. He was a political architect and co-signer of the Treaty of Wehlau in 1657 and participated also in the Treaty of Oliva in 1660. During his political career he acted as an advisor to Frederick William, Elector of Brandenburg. As a gratification for his diplomatical achievements Frederick William presented to him in 1653 the manor of Eichmedien (Nakomiady) in Masuria, Duchy of Prussia. In 1663 the title of a baron war awarded to Johann von Hoverbeck.

In 1644 Hoverbeck married Anna Sophia, a daughter of Wolf Dietrich von Rochow. Anna Sophia, with whom he had eleven children, died in 1659. His son Johann Dietrich von Hoverbeck became a diplomat too. Hoverbeck died in 1682 in Hohenstein (Olsztynek) in Masuria, Duchy of Prussia.

== Writings ==
Hoverbeck's political letters have been reprinted in scientific monographies on history, such as (see index):

- B. Erdmannsdörfer ( ed.): Urkunden und Actenstücke zur Geschichte des Kurfürsten Friedrich Wilhelm von Brandenburg. Politische Verhandlungen.
  - Vol 1, Berlin 1864 (online)
  - Vol 2, Berlin 1865 (online).

== Literature ==
- Altpreußische Biographie. Vol. 1 (Christian Krollmann, ed.), Elwert, Marburg/Lahn 1974, p. 291.
- Deutsche Biographische Enzyklopädie, 2nd edition (Rudolf Vierhaus, ed.), Vol 5, Saur, Munich 2006, p. 155.
- Max Hein: Johann von Hoverbeck. Ein Diplomatenleben aus der Zeit des Großen Kurfürsten, 1925.
- Ernst Heinrich Kneschke: Neues allgemeines Deutsches Adels-Lexicon. Vol. 4, Leipzig 1863, p. 493–494 (online).
