= Szczyglice =

Szczyglice may refer to the following places in Poland:

- Szczyglice, Lower Silesian Voivodeship (south-west Poland)
- Szczyglice, Lesser Poland Voivodeship (south Poland)
