= Kleszczów =

Kleszczów may refer to the following places:

- Kleszczów, Lesser Poland Voivodeship, south Poland
- Kleszczów, Łódź Voivodeship, central Poland
- Kleszczów, Silesian Voivodeship, south Poland
