= Lidia Milka-Wieczorkiewicz =

Polish politician

Lidia Milka-Wieczorkiewicz Ph.D.
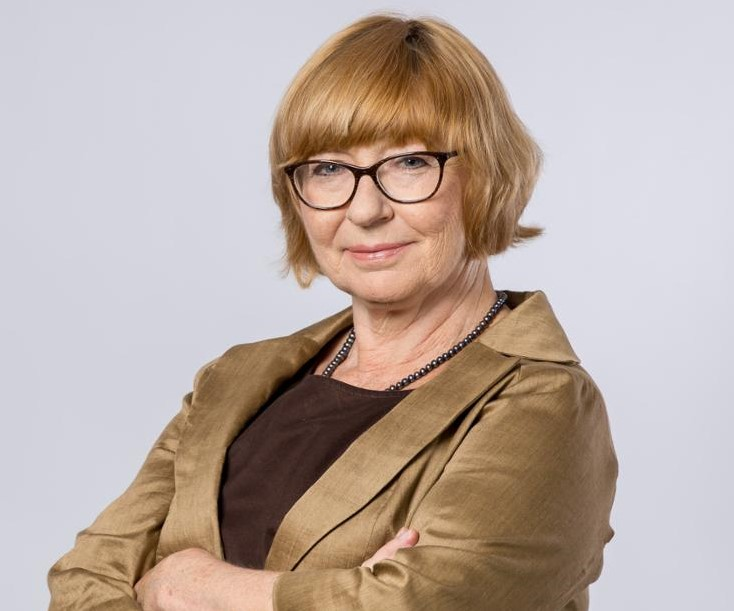

Poland Ambassador to Algeria
- In office 2006–2011
- Preceded by: Janusz Mrowiec
- Succeeded by: Michał Radlicki

Poland Ambassador to Tunisia
- In office 3 August 2016 – 30 June 2022
- Preceded by: Iwo Byczewski
- Succeeded by: Justyna Porazińska

Personal details
- Born: 29 May 1956 (age 70) Niegoszowice, Poland
- Education: University of Warsaw
- Profession: Diplomat

Lidia Anna Milka-Wieczorkiewicz (born 29 May 1956 in Niegoszowice) is a Polish historian and diplomat, ambassador to Algeria (2006–2011) and Tunisia (2016–2022).

== Life ==
=== Education and academic work ===
Milka-Wieczorkiewicz was born on 29 May 1956 in Niegoszowice. She graduated from high school in Dąbrowa Górnicza. Following her studies at the University of Silesia in Katowice, in 1979, she graduated in history from the University of Warsaw. She started academic career there. In 1988, she defended her doctoral thesis on France–Morocco relations. As a scientist, she has been interested in history of Middle East and North Africa countries. She has been carrying out research at the Mohammed V University, Rabat and École des hautes études en sciences sociales, Paris.

Beside Polish, she speaks English and French languages.

=== Diplomatic career ===
In 1989 Milka-Wieczorkiewicz joined the diplomatic service. Firstly, she worked as head of consular section at the embassy in Rabat. In 1997 she became Minister-Counsellor at the Africa and Middle East Department at the Ministry of Foreign Affairs. Since 1999 has been serving at the embassy in Beirut, being for more than a year chargé d'affaires there. In 2004 she returned to Poland, became secretary general of the Polish National Commission for UNESCO. Between 2006 and 2011 she was Ambassador to Algeria, accredited to Burkina Faso and Mali as well. On 3 August 2016 she became ambassador to Tunisia. She ended her term on 30 June 2022.

== Works ==
- Droga do niepodległości: polityka Francji wobec Maroka w latach 1944–1953, Warszawa: Wydawnictwa Uniwersytetu Warszawskiego, 1993.
