= Zelków =

- Village
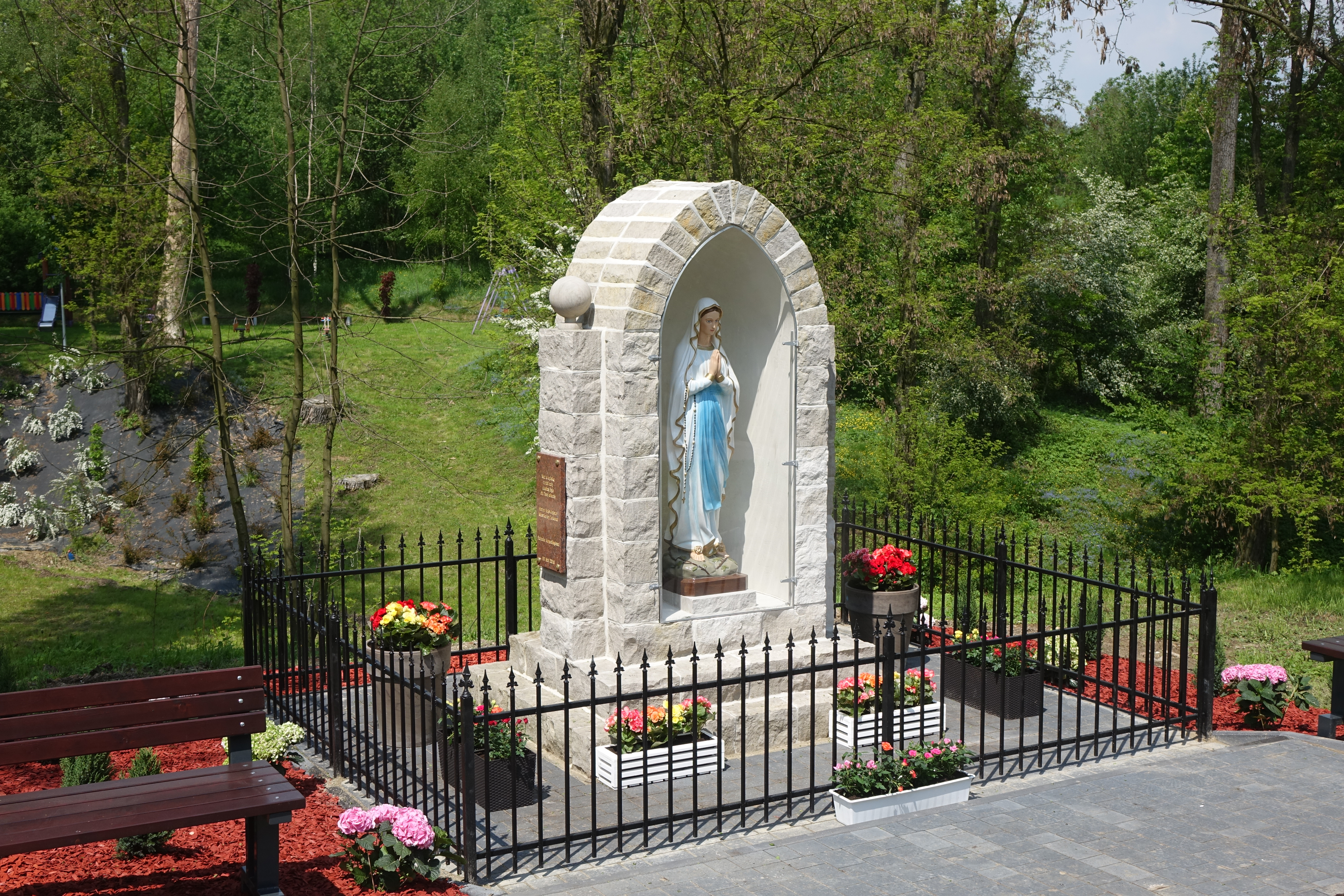
- Chapel

- Location within Poland
- Coordinates: 50°10′N 19°48′E
- Country: Poland
- Voivodeship: Lesser Poland
- County: Kraków
- Gmina: Zabierzów
- Population: 590

Zelków [ˈzɛlkuf] is a village in the administrative district of Gmina Zabierzów, within Kraków County, Lesser Poland Voivodeship, in southern Poland. The village is located in the historical region Galicia.

There are several distinct neighborhoods in Zelków. Some of these include Gacki, Wyźrał, Łączki, and Widok.

In Zelków there is a sign commemorating the former border that existed between Russia and Austria. Zelków was in the Austrian part. It is located about 15 minutes from Ojców National Park.

The village remains small, with a population of 590, mainly due to its isolation and poor farming environment. Nevertheless, Zelków is connected to Kraków by public transit (Bus 242) and minivans ("bus" in Polish).
