= Pisary, Lesser Poland Voivodeship =

Pisary
- Village
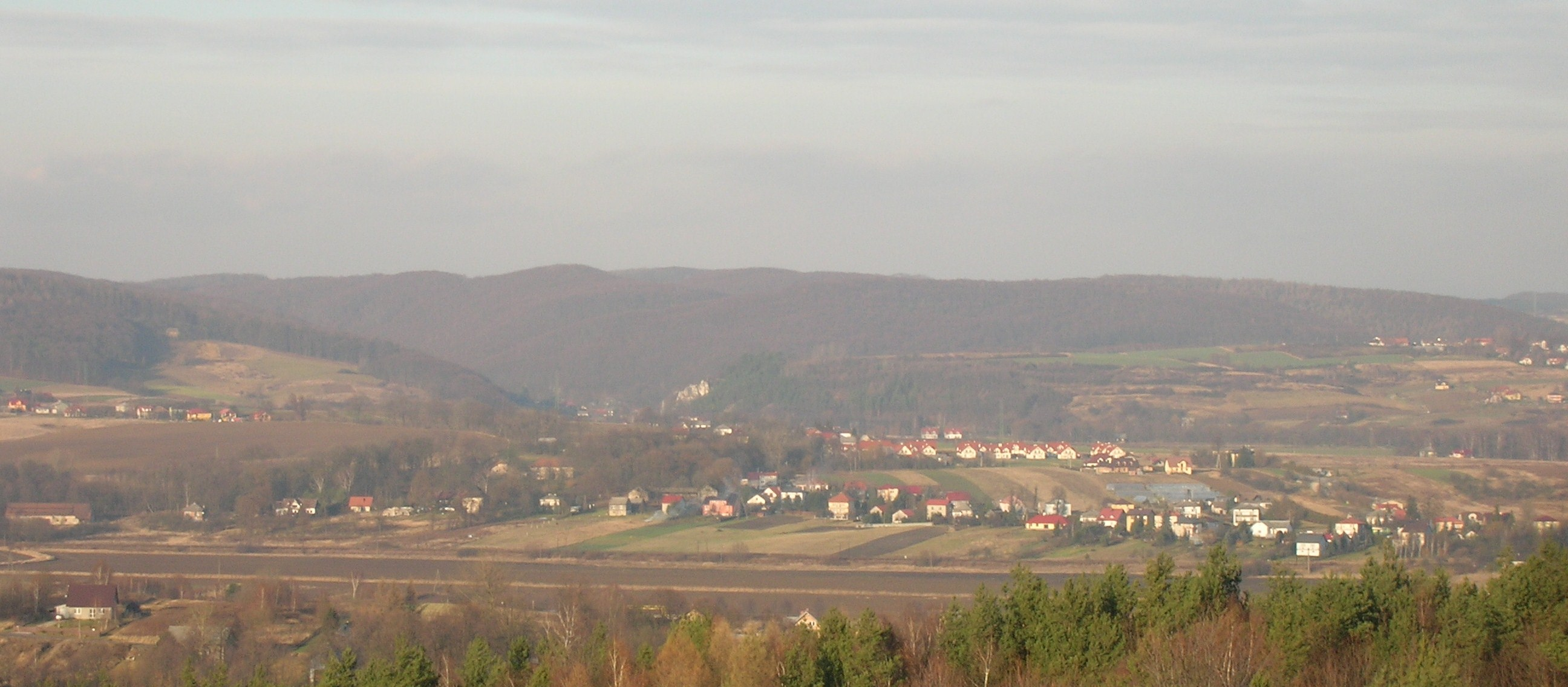

- Location within Poland
- Coordinates: 50°7′34″N 19°41′45″E
- Country: Poland
- Voivodeship: Lesser Poland
- County: Kraków
- Gmina: Zabierzów
- Population: 568

Pisary [piˈsarɨ] is a village in the administrative district of Gmina Zabierzów, within Kraków County, Lesser Poland Voivodeship, in southern Poland.
