= Brzoskwinia, Lesser Poland Voivodeship =

Brzoskwinia
- Village
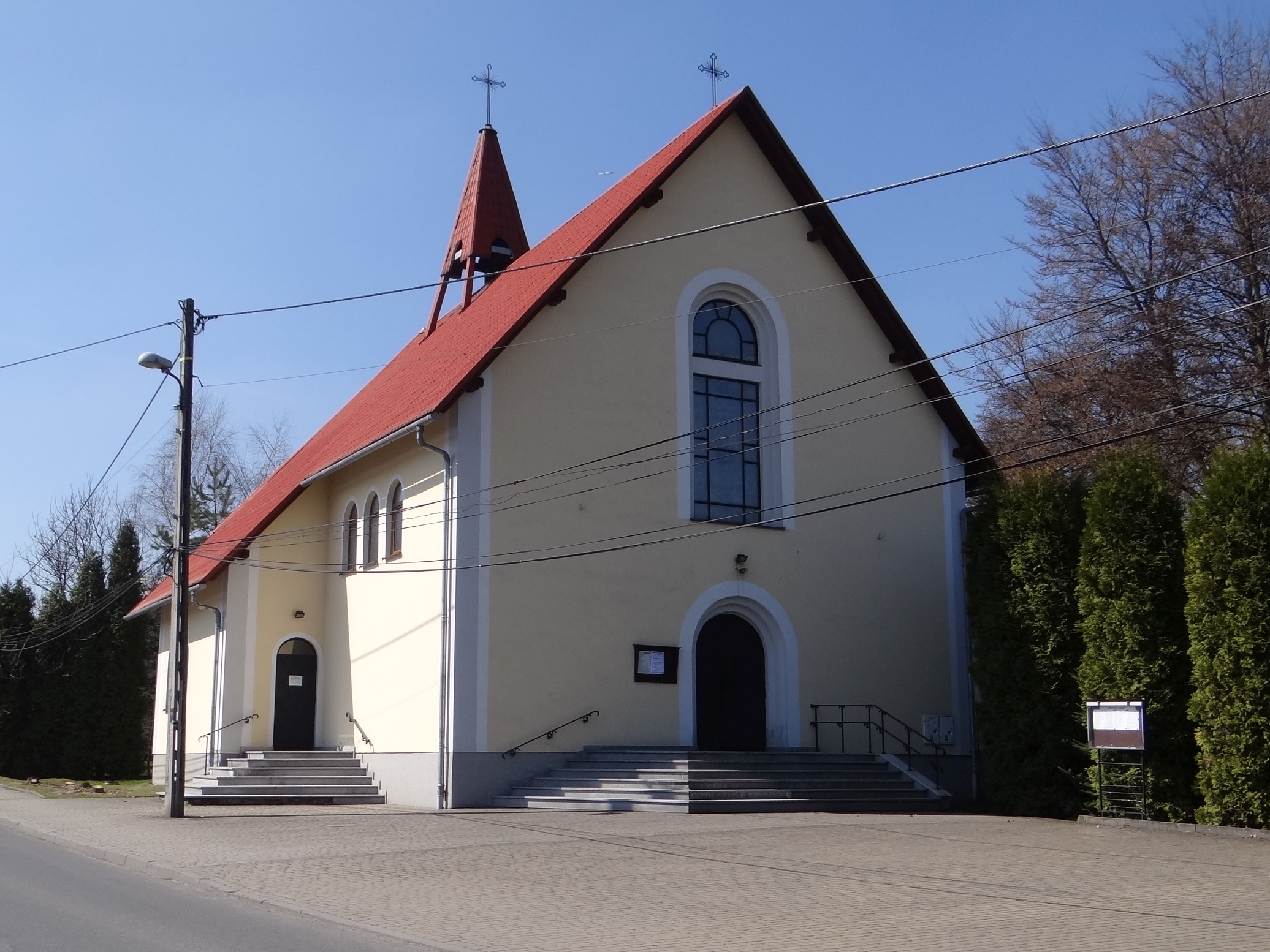
- Church in Brzoskwinia

- Location within Poland
- Coordinates: 50°5′N 19°43′E
- Country: Poland
- Voivodeship: Lesser Poland
- County: Kraków
- Gmina: Zabierzów
- Population (approx.): 900
- Time zone: UTC+1 (CET)
  - Summer (DST): UTC+2 (CEST)
- Vehicle registration: KRA
- Primary airport: Kraków John Paul II International Airport

Brzoskwinia [bʐɔskˈfiɲa] is a village in the administrative district of Gmina Zabierzów, within Kraków County, Lesser Poland Voivodeship, in southern Poland. It is located in the historic region of Lesser Poland.

The village has an approximate population of 900.
