= Bolechowice, Lesser Poland Voivodeship =

Bolechowice
- Village
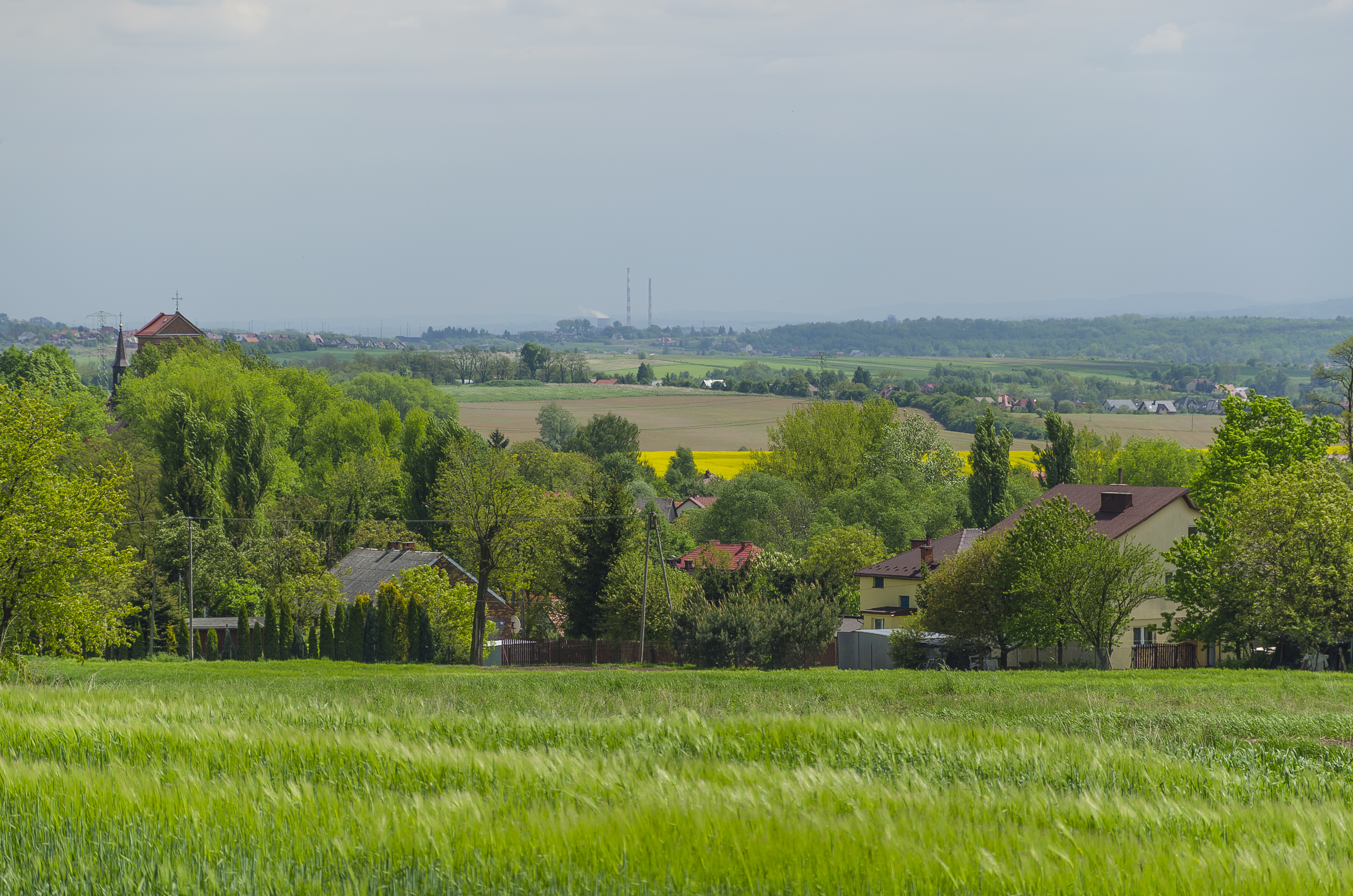

- Location within Poland
- Coordinates: 50°9′N 19°48′E
- Country: Poland
- Voivodeship: Lesser Poland
- County: Kraków
- Gmina: Zabierzów
- Population: 1,515

Bolechowice [bɔlɛxɔˈvit͡sɛ] is a village in the administrative district of Gmina Zabierzów, within Kraków County, Lesser Poland Voivodeship, in southern Poland.
