= Ujazd, Kraków County =

Ujazd
- Village
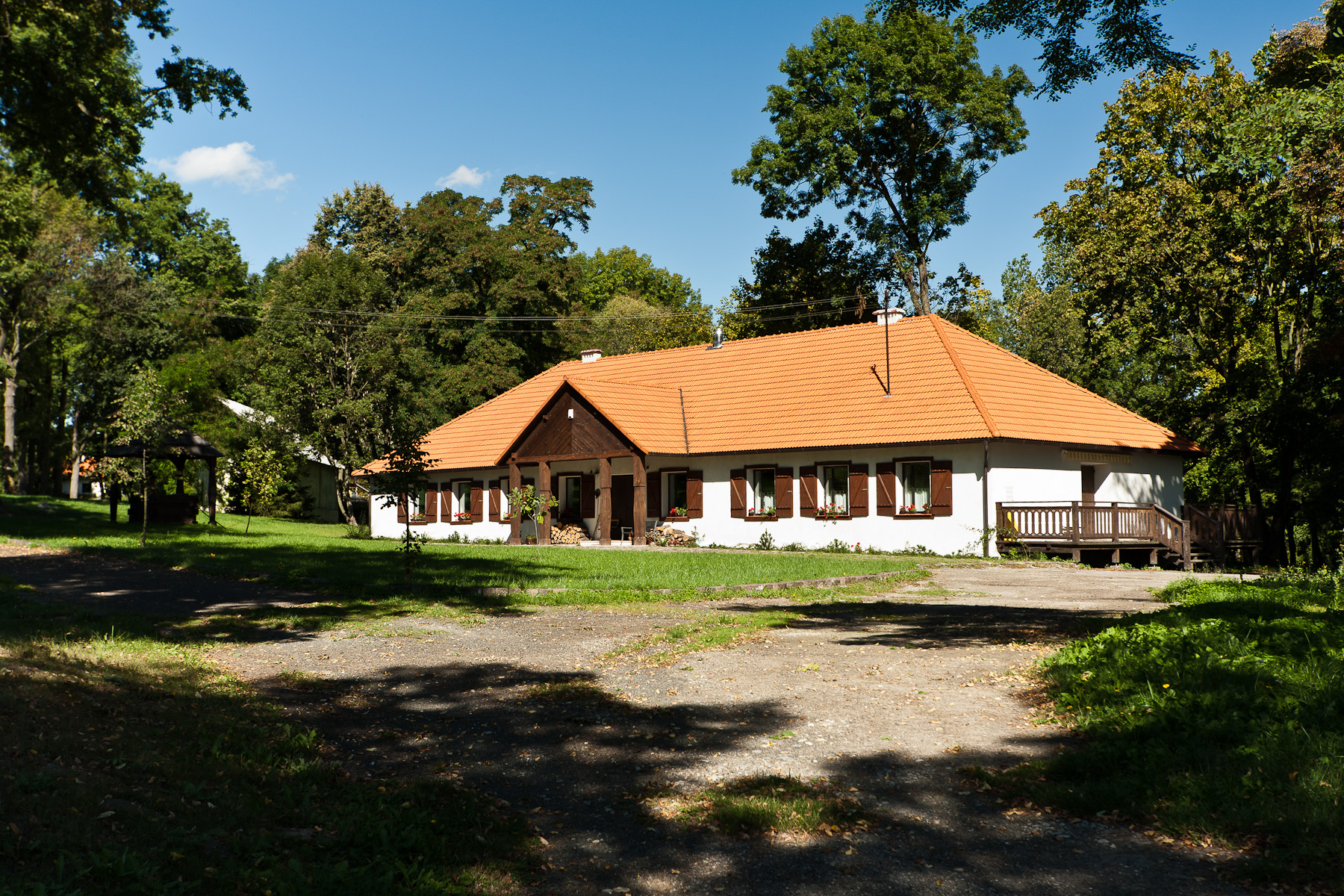

- Location within Poland
- Coordinates: 50°8′N 19°49′E
- Country: Poland
- Voivodeship: Lesser Poland
- County: Kraków
- Gmina: Zabierzów
- Population: 320

Ujazd [ˈujast] is a village in the administrative district of Gmina Zabierzów, within Kraków County, Lesser Poland Voivodeship, in southern Poland. The village is located in the historical region Galicia.
