= Nakomiady =

- Village
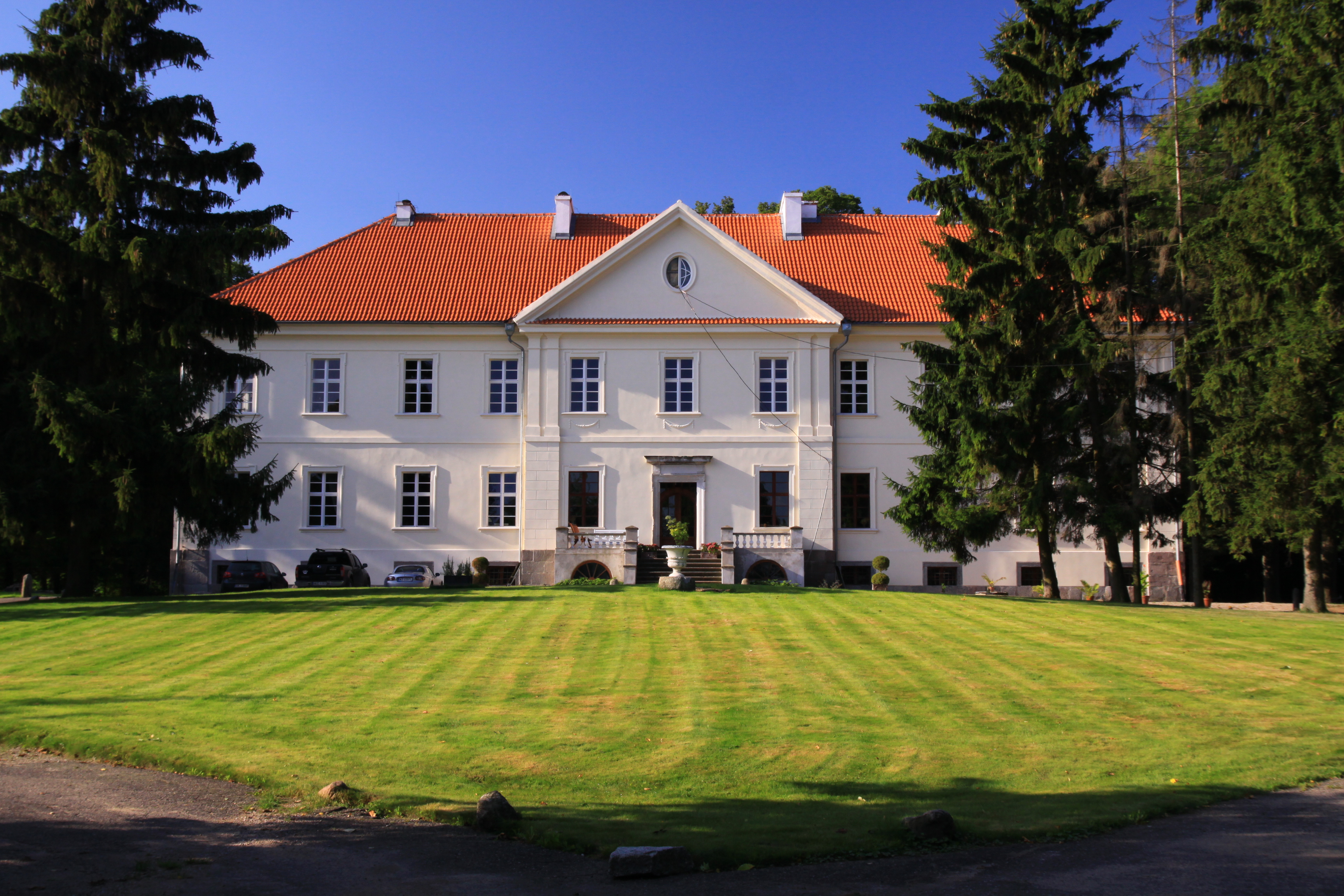
- Nakomiady Palace

- Location within Poland
- Coordinates: 54°0′27″N 21°27′8″E
- Country: Poland
- Voivodeship: Warmian-Masurian
- County: Kętrzyn
- Gmina: Kętrzyn

Population
  - Total: 670
- Postal code: 11-400
- Vehicle registration: NKE

Nakomiady [nakɔˈmjadɨ] (German: Eichmedien) is a village in the administrative district of Gmina Kętrzyn, within Kętrzyn County, Warmian-Masurian Voivodeship, in northern Poland. It is located in the region of Masuria.

== History ==
A castle was built by the Teutonic Knight Konrad von Kyburg between 1392 and 1396, this castle was later destroyed and only the cellar-vault and foundation walls remained. As of 1539, the population was almost entirely Polish. In 1653 Frederick William I, Elector of Brandenburg awarded the property of Eichmedien and the surrounding villages to Johann von Hoverbeck as gratification for his role as Prussian ambassador to Warsaw. A majestic palace was constructed on the ruins of the order's castle. In 1789, Friedrich von Redecker acquired the village, and it remained under the ownership of the Redecker family until 1930.
