= Karniowice, Kraków County =

Karniowice
- Village
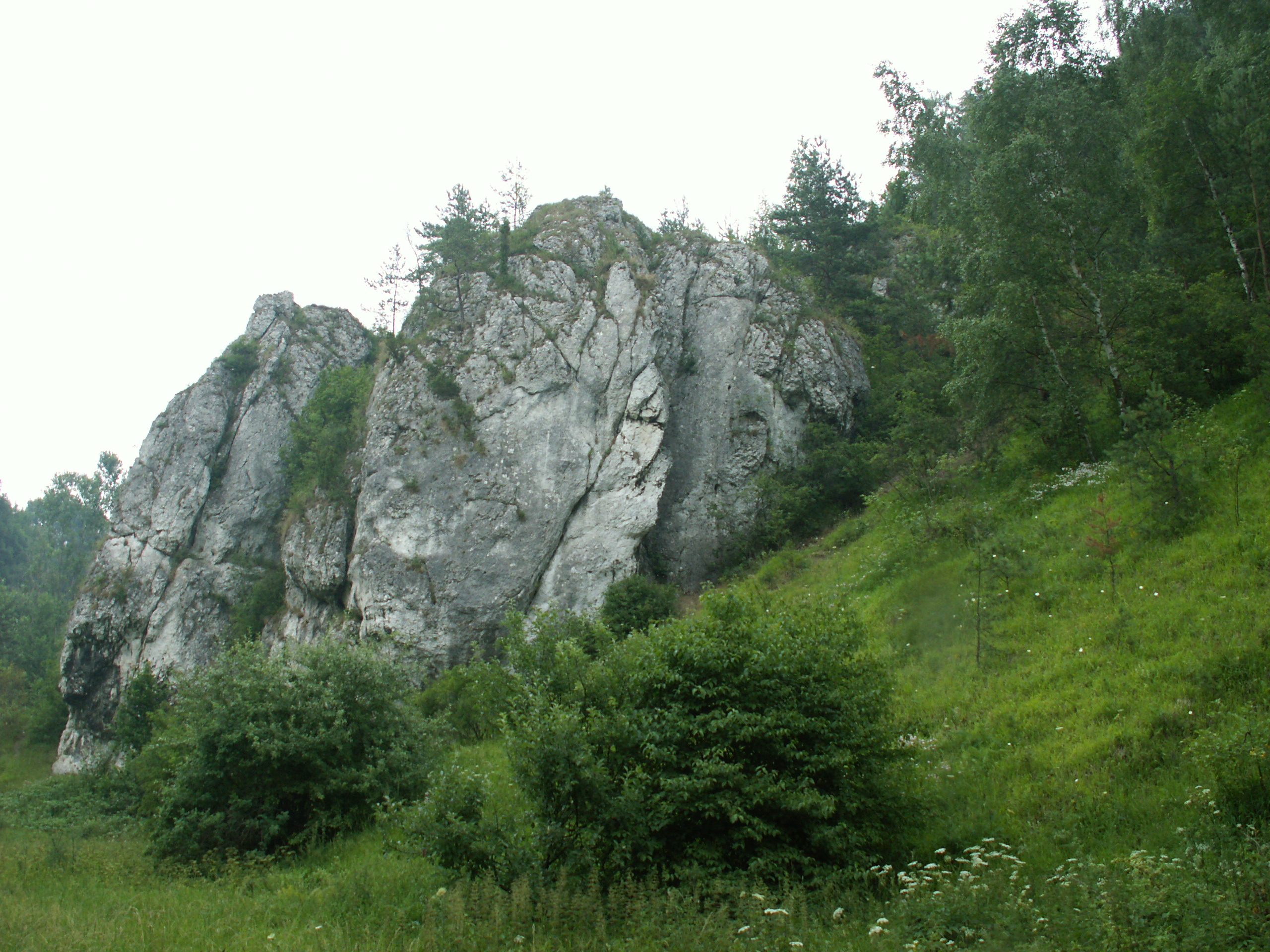
- View of a mountain in Karniowice

- Location within Poland
- Coordinates: 50°08′57″N 19°46′39″E
- Country: Poland
- Voivodeship: Lesser Poland
- County: Kraków
- Gmina: Zabierzów
- Population (approx.): 841

Karniowice [karɲɔˈvit͡sɛ] is a village in the administrative district of Gmina Zabierzów, within Kraków County, Lesser Poland Voivodeship, in southern Poland. The village is located in the historical region Galicia.

The village has an approximate population of 841.
