= Zabierzów, Lesser Poland Voivodeship =

Zabierzów
- Village
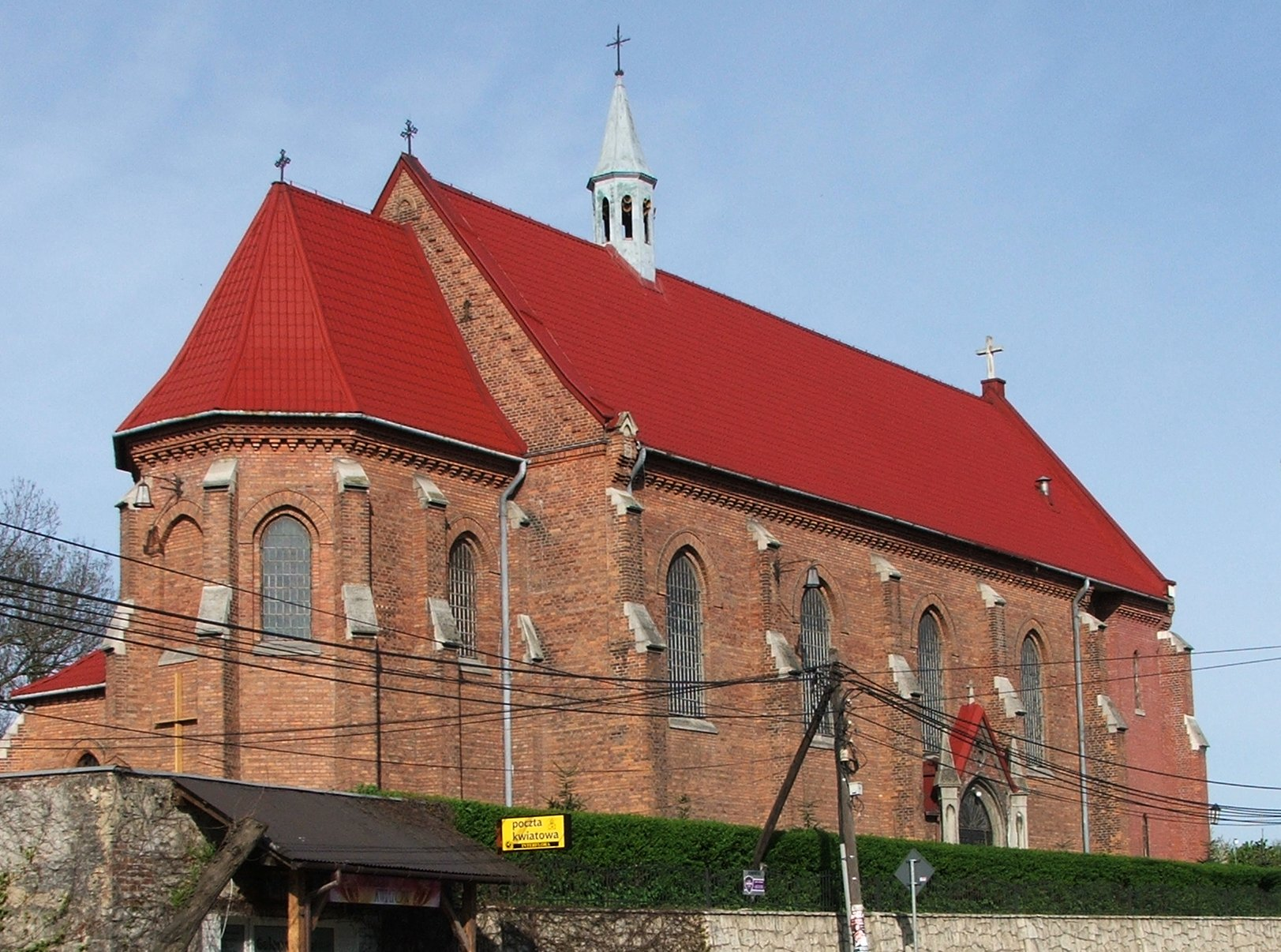
- Church of Saint Francis in Zabierzów

- Location within Poland
- Coordinates: 50°07′05″N 19°46′47″E
- Country: Poland
- Voivodeship: Lesser Poland
- Powiat: Kraków
- Gmina: Zabierzów
- Established: fourteenth century

Government
  - Mayor: Józef Woch

Population (2004)
  - Total: 4,400
- Time zone: UTC+1 (CET)
  - Summer (DST): UTC+2 (CEST)
- Postal code: 32-080
- Area code: +48 12
- Car Plates: KRA
- Website: zabierzow.org.pl

Zabierzów [zaˈbjɛʐuf] is a village in southern Poland in the Kraków metropolitan area and situated (since 1999) in Lesser Poland Voivodship, previously (1975–1998) in Kraków Voivodship. Religions: Roman Catholicism (The Church) and Jehovah's Witnesses.

== Notable residents ==
- Adolf Liebeskind (1912–1942), member of the Jewish resistance in the Kraków Ghetto.
