= Justyna Porazińska =

Polish diplomat

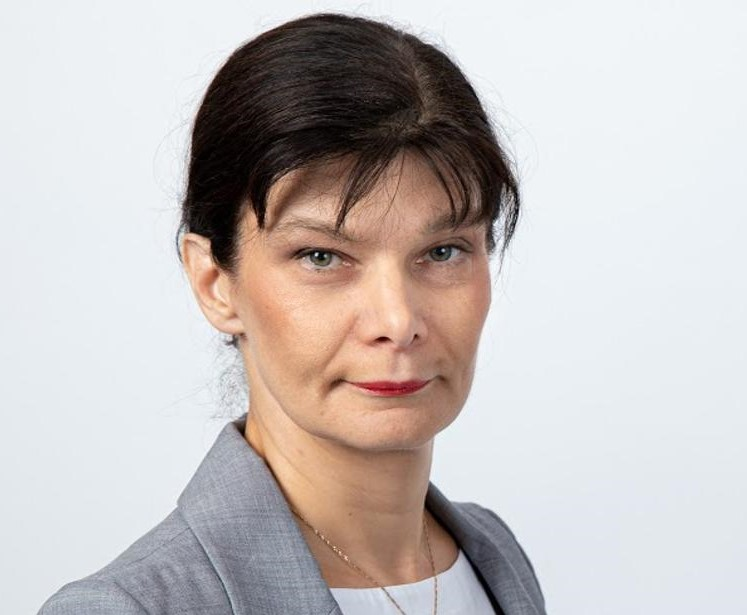

Poland Ambassador to Tunisia
- In office 1 July 2022 – 31 January 2026
- Preceded by: Lidia Milka-Wieczorkiewicz

Personal details
- Education: University of Warsaw
- Profession: Diplomat

Justyna Porazińska (née Brzozowska) is a Polish diplomat, ambassador to Tunisia (2022–2026), chargé d'affaires to Libya (2019–2022).

== Life ==
Porazińska graduated from Arab studies at the University of Warsaw (1996) and the National School of Public Administration (2004).

In 1995, she started her professional career at the Polish Chamber of Commerce. Between 2001–2002 was a spokesperson for the Łomianki Municipal Office. In 2004, she joined the Ministry of Foreign Affairs. She was responsible for the relations between Poland and the Arab countries of the Gulf at the Department of Africa and the Middle East. From 2005 to 2010 she served as Head of Political and Economic Section at the Embassy in Damascus. She returned to the Department of Africa and the Middle East, being in charge of the cooperation with the Maghreb. Between 2014 and 2019 as a minister-counsellor she was heading the Political and Economic Unit at the Embassy in Cairo. Since 1 September 2019, she is chargé d’affaires a.i. of the Republic of Poland to the State of Libya, residing in Tunis. On 1 July 2022 she took the post of the ambassador to Tunisia. She ended her term on 31 January 2026.

She speaks fluently Arabic, English and French. She speaks Italian and Russian, as well.
