= Brzezinka, Kraków County =

Brzezinka
- Village
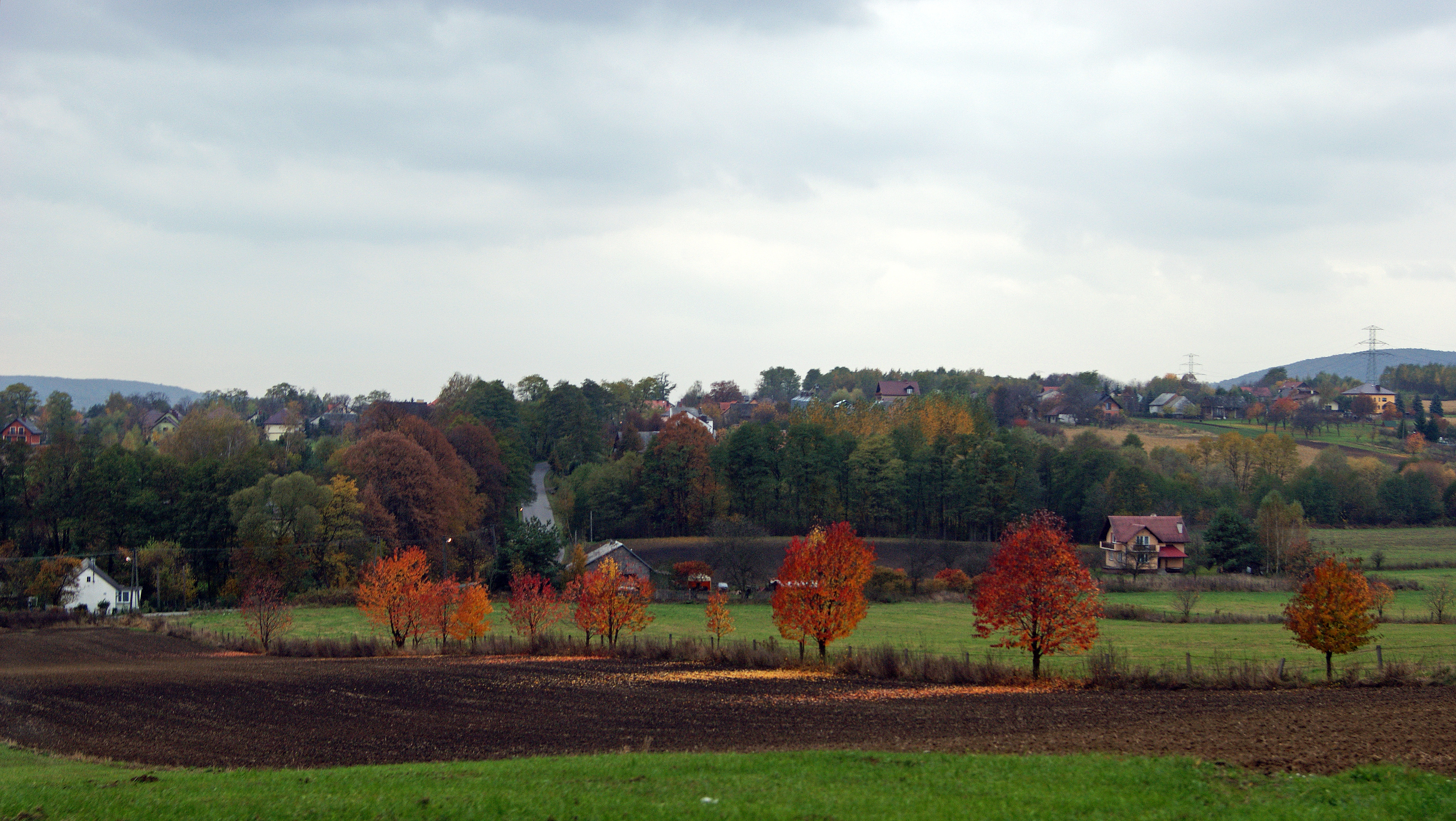

- Location within Poland
- Coordinates: 50°8′16″N 19°44′18″E
- Country: Poland
- Voivodeship: Lesser Poland
- County: Kraków
- Gmina: Zabierzów
- Population: 605
- Time zone: UTC+1 (CET)
  - Summer (DST): UTC+2 (CEST)
- Vehicle registration: KRA
- Primary airport: Kraków John Paul II International Airport

Brzezinka (Polish pronunciation: [bʐɛˈʑiŋka]) is a village in the administrative district of Gmina Zabierzów, within Kraków County, Lesser Poland Voivodeship, in southern Poland.
