= Nielepice =

- Village
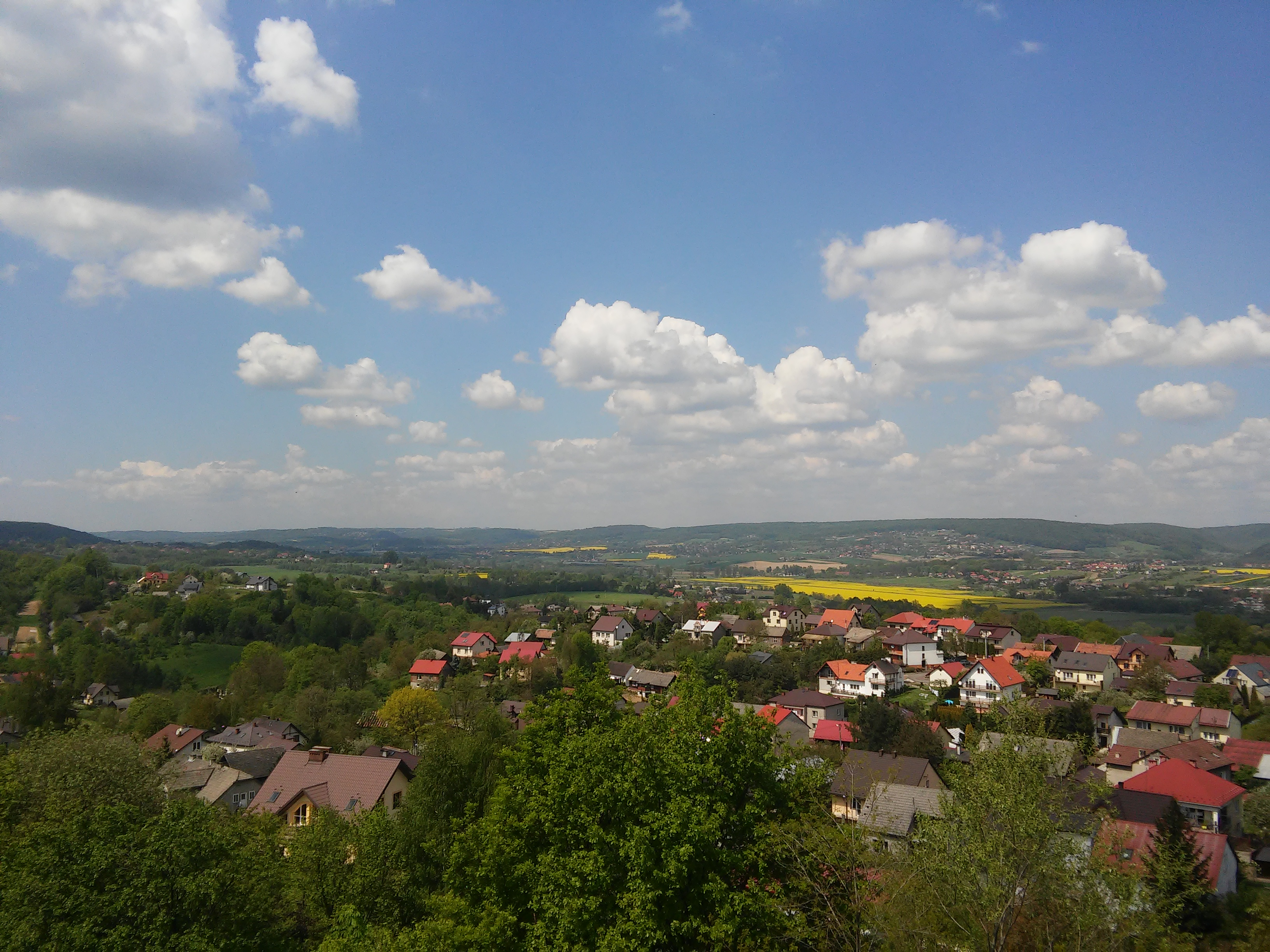

- Location within Poland
- Coordinates: 50°6′N 19°42′E
- Country: Poland
- Voivodeship: Lesser Poland
- County: Kraków
- Gmina: Zabierzów
- Population: 734

Nielepice [ɲɛlɛˈpit͡sɛ] is a village in the administrative district of Gmina Zabierzów, within Kraków County, Lesser Poland Voivodeship, in southern Poland.
