= Więckowice, Kraków County =

Więckowice
- Village
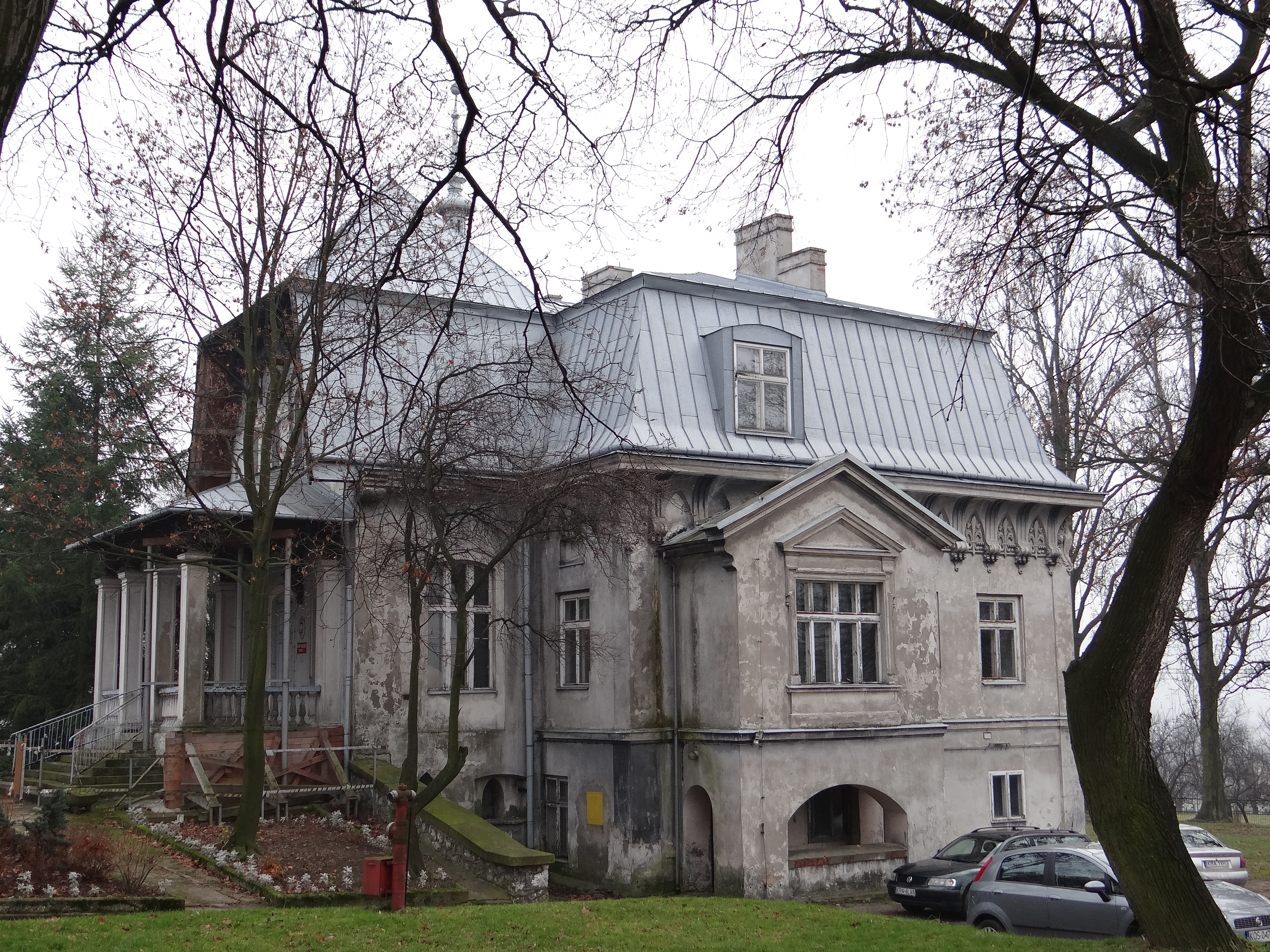
- Manor house

- Location within Poland
- Coordinates: 50°8′0″N 19°46′0″E
- Country: Poland
- Voivodeship: Lesser Poland
- County: Kraków
- Gmina: Zabierzów
- Elevation: 250 m (820 ft)
- Population: 592

Więckowice [vjɛnt͡skɔˈvit͡sɛ] is a village in the administrative district of Gmina Zabierzów, within Kraków County, Lesser Poland Voivodeship, in southern Poland.
