= Młynka =

- Village
- Location within Poland
- Coordinates: 50°6′N 19°41′E
- Country: Poland
- Voivodeship: Lesser Poland
- County: Kraków
- Gmina: Zabierzów
- Population (approx.): 300

Młynka [ˈmwɨŋka] is a village in the administrative district of Gmina Zabierzów, within Kraków County, Lesser Poland Voivodeship, in southern Poland.

The village has an approximate population of 300.
