= Kochanów, Lesser Poland Voivodeship =

Kochanów
- Village
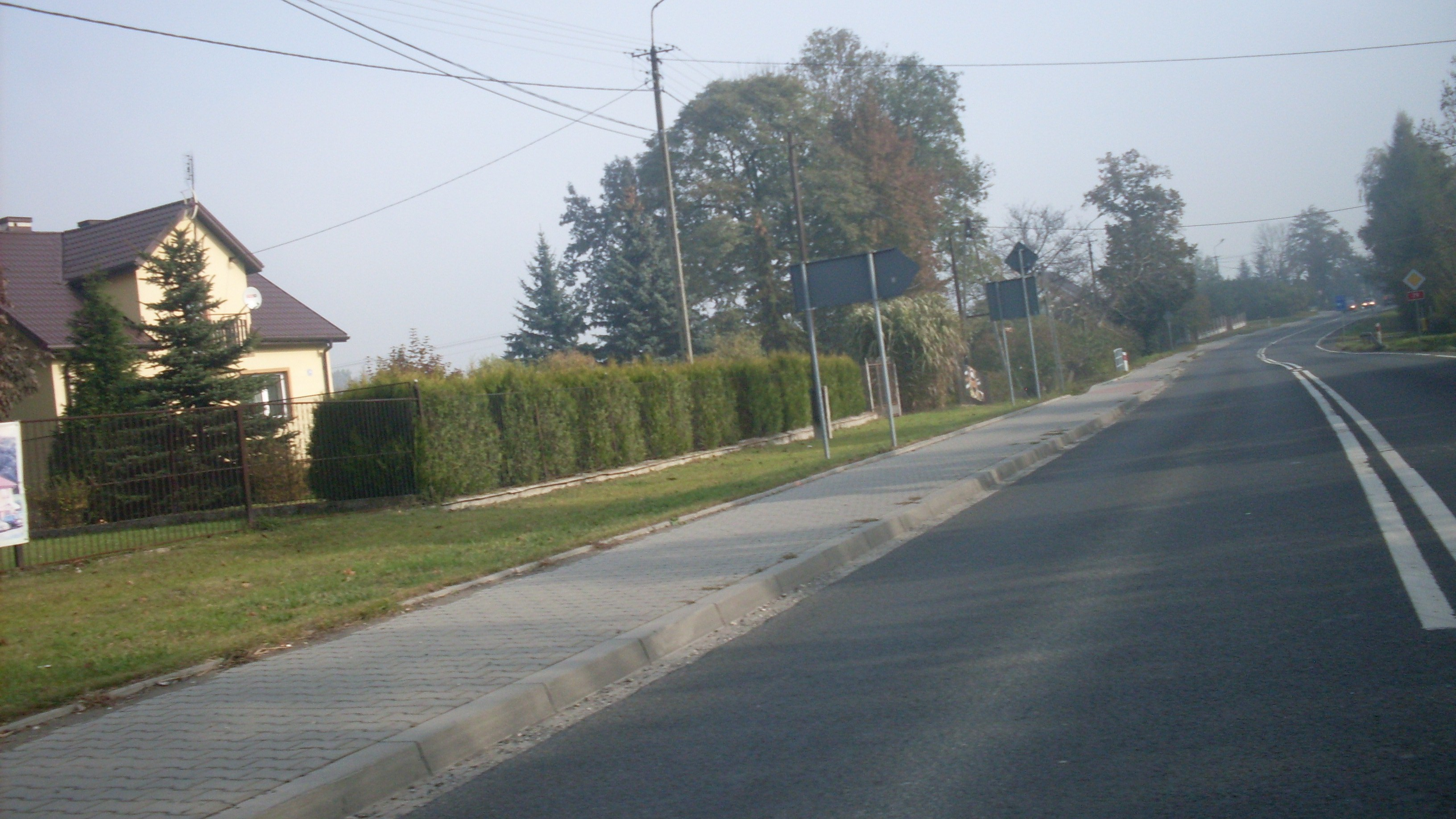

- Location within Poland
- Coordinates: 50°6′54″N 19°44′54″E
- Country: Poland
- Voivodeship: Lesser Poland
- County: Kraków
- Gmina: Zabierzów
- Population: 300

Kochanów [kɔˈxanuf] is a village in the administrative district of Gmina Zabierzów, within Kraków County, Lesser Poland Voivodeship, in southern Poland.
