= Iwo Byczewski =

Polish diplomat (born 1948)

Iwo Byczewski Ph.D.
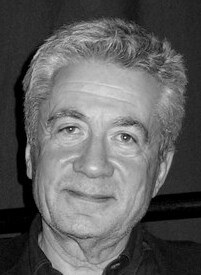
- Iwo Byczewski (2009)

3rd Poland Ambassador to the European Union
- In office 2001–2002
- Preceded by: Jan Truszczyński
- Succeeded by: Marek Grela

Poland Ambassador to Belgium
- In office 2002–2006
- Preceded by: Jan Wojciech Piekarski
- Succeeded by: Sławomir Czarlewski

Poland Ambassador to Tunisia
- In office 2012–2016
- Preceded by: Krzysztof Olendzki
- Succeeded by: Lidia Milka-Wieczorkiewicz

Personal details
- Born: 29 February 1948 (age 78) Poznań
- Spouse: Anna Nehrebecka
- Education: Adam Mickiewicz University in Poznań
- Profession: Diplomat, jurist

Iwo Byczewski (born 29 February 1948, in Poznań) is a Polish diplomat. He served as Deputy Foreign Minister (1991–1995), Ambassador to Belgium and Permanent Representative to the European Union.

== Life ==
He is a law graduate from the Adam Mickiewicz University in Poznań and studied at the College of Europe (1971–1972, Dante Alighieri promotion) in Bruges. He has a doctorate from the Institute of State and Law of the Polish Academy of Sciences in 1972. Between 1977 and 1982 he was working for the Ministry of Justice. He has been Solidarity member. As active dissident he was taking part in Polish Round Table Agreement negotiations.

He joined the Ministry of Foreign Affairs in 1990 when Poland became independent, serving as vice minister from 1991 to 1995. Then, he worked in business since the mid 90s. In 2001, he was appointed Permanent Representative of Poland to the European Union. From 2002 to 2007, he served as Ambassador to Belgium. From 2012 to 2016 Byczewski served as Ambassador to Tunisia.

He is married to Anna Nehrebecka.

== Honours ==
- Officer's Cross of the Order of Polonia Restituta (1995)
- Commander's Cross of the Order of Polonia Restituta (2009)
