= Kobylany, Lesser Poland Voivodeship =

Kobylany
- Village
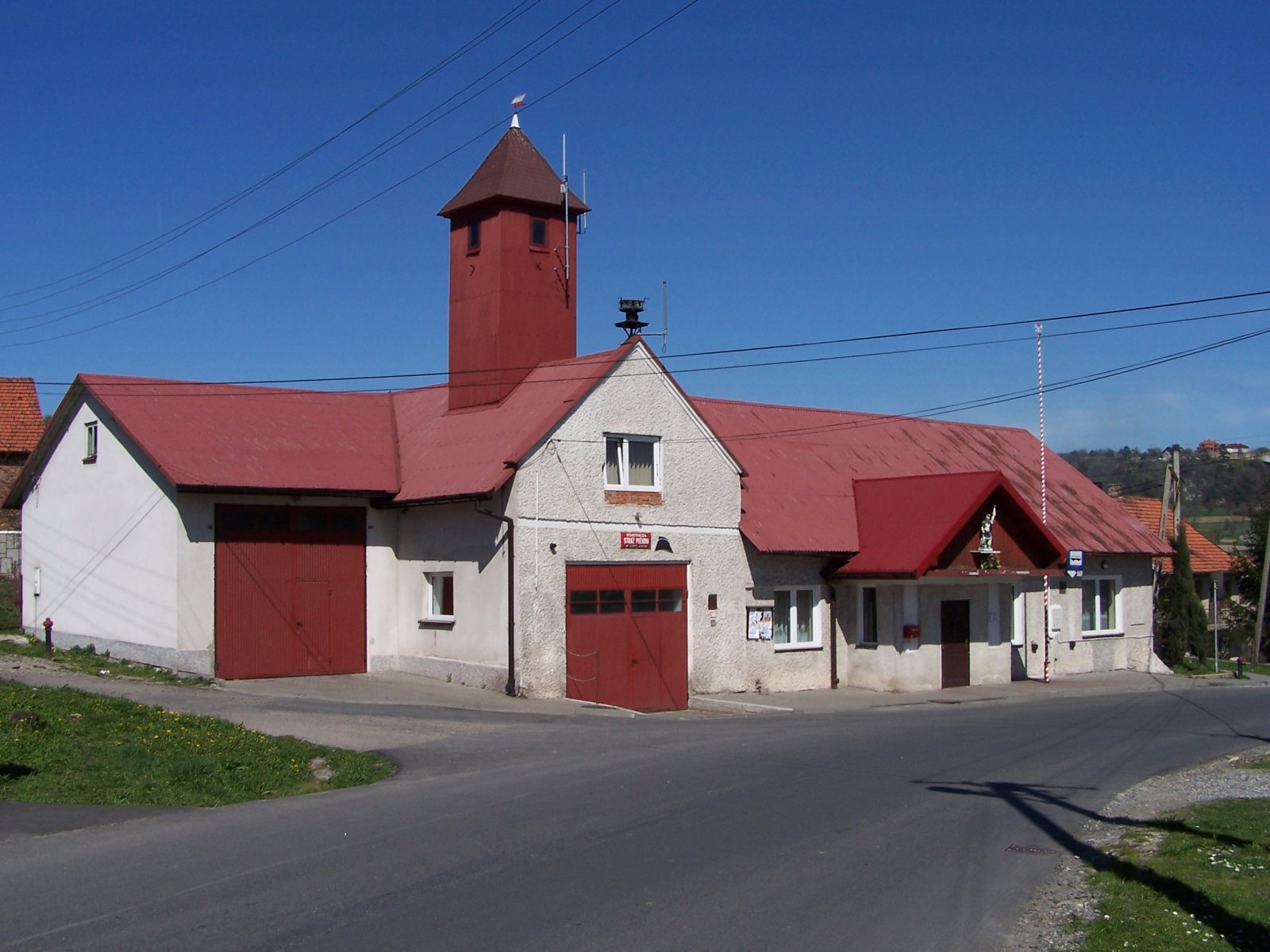
- Fire station

- Location within Poland
- Coordinates: 50°8′51″N 19°45′29″E
- Country: Poland
- Voivodeship: Lesser Poland
- County: Kraków
- Gmina: Zabierzów
- Elevation: 292 m (958 ft)
- Population: 780

Kobylany [kɔbɨˈlanɨ] is a village in the administrative district of Gmina Zabierzów, within Kraków County, Lesser Poland Voivodeship, in southern Poland. The village is located in the historical region Galicia.
