= Adolf Liebeskind =

Polish activist (1912–1942)

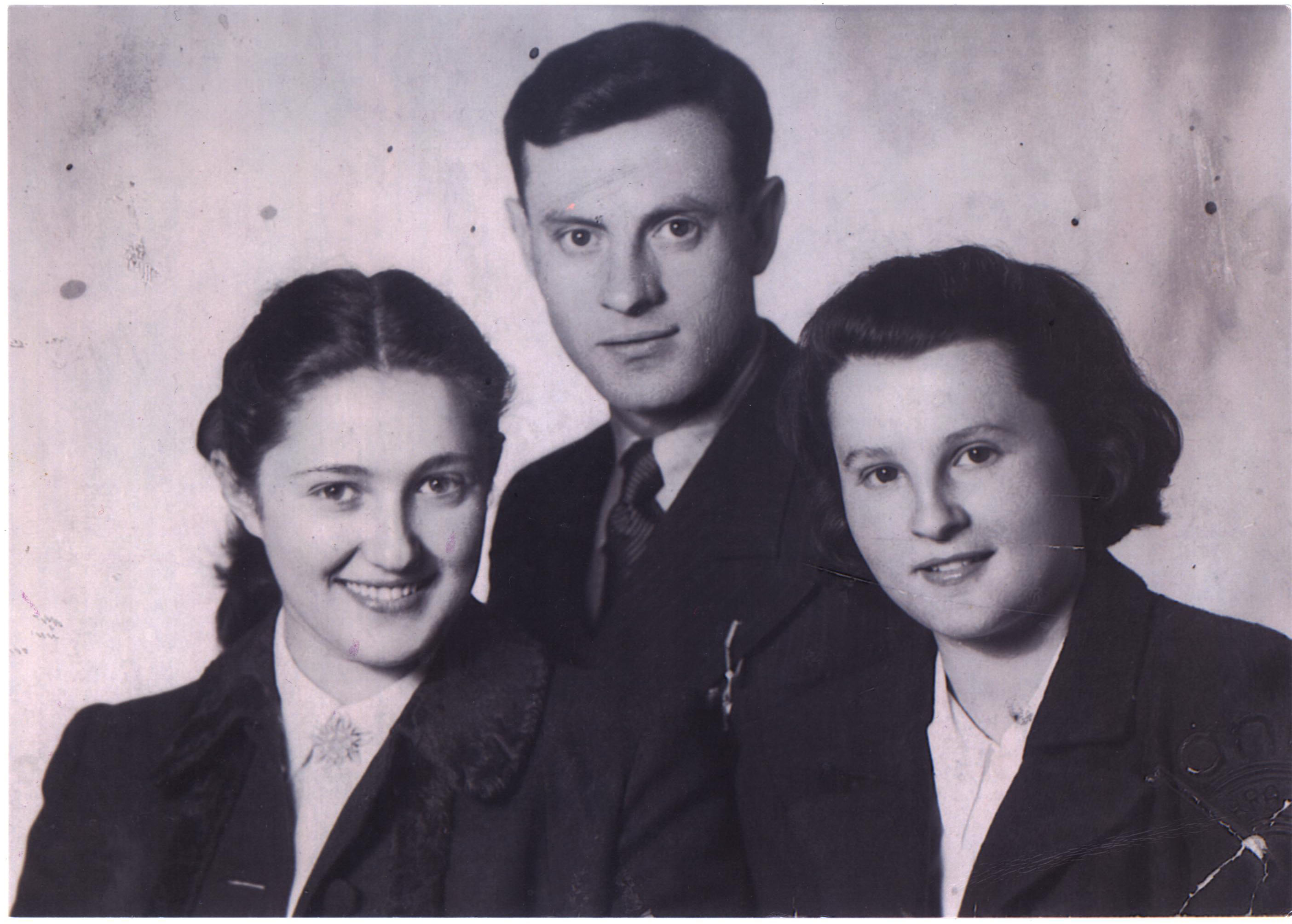
- Liebeskind (centre) with his sister Miriam (right) and wife Rebeka (left)
- Born: 3 October 1912; Zabierzów, Austria-Hungary
- Died: 24 December 1942 (aged 30); Kraków, Poland
- Education: Jagiellonian University
- Occupation: Lawyer
- Known for: Leading the resistance in the Kraków Ghetto

Adolf "Dolek" Liebeskind (3 October 1912 – 24 December 1942) was a Polish lawyer and a leader of the Jewish resistance movement within the Kraków Ghetto.

== Biography ==
=== Early life and education ===
Liebeskind was born on 3 October 1912 in Zabierzów, a village near the city of Kraków. His parents, Igancz Liebeskind and Esther Liebeskind (née Vogler), were religious Zionists. At the age of 14, Liebeskind joined the Kraków branch of Akiva, a religious Zionist youth organisation.

Liebeskind studied law at Jagiellonian University, and was in the process of preparing his doctoral dissertation when World War II broke out in September 1939. He had become secretary general of Akiva's Kraków branch, and later became its national secretary, prompting him to move to Warsaw. In December 1939, Liebeskind married Rebeka Kuper, an Akiva member.

=== Formation of the Jewish resistance in the Kraków Ghetto ===
After the German occupation of Poland in September 1939, Liebeskind opted to remain in Poland, despite having received a certificate of departure that would have permitted him to emigrate to Mandatory Palestine. Instead, he opted to return to Kraków, settling at 9 Limanovsky Street with his wife and taking a job with Jewish Social Self-Help. At the same time, Liebeskind began to become involved with Jewish and Polish resistance movements against the Nazis. Through the JSSH, Liebeskind and Szymszon Dränger helped run a farm in Kopaliny; as Jews were forced to relocate to specific areas such as Kazimierz and Podgórze, Kraków (the latter of which became the site of the formal Kraków Ghetto from 1940), the farm allowed Liebeskind and Dränger to legally leave the city and promote the underground resistance to people living outside of the Ghetto. In 1941, the farm was shut down by the General Government, preventing Liebeskind from legally leaving the Ghetto.

Liebeskind and Dränger created He-Chaluc ha-Lochem, one of several resistance groups established within the Kraków Ghetto. The group provided training on weapons and self-defence to Jews living in the area, in addition to providing mutual assistance. Later, He-Chaluc ha-Lochem and other resistance groups operating in the Ghetto, such as Ha-Shomer Ha-Za'ir and Ikra, agreed to join to form the Kraków branch of the Jewish Combat Organization (ŻOB) in August 1942, as had previously occurred in the Warsaw Ghetto a month prior. Other notable ŻOB members in Kraków included Dränger; his wife, Gusta; Hersz Bauminger, the founder of Ha-Shomer Ha-Za'ir; Bernard Halbrajch, Gola Mire; and Abraham Lejbowicz.

Liebeskind became one of the key resistance leaders in the Kraków Ghetto. Leading cells of five, ŻOB led a series of attacks across the city, including setting fire to a garage holding government vehicles in Grzegórzki; attacking Optima, a German factory within the Ghetto; attacking German checkpoints; and attempting to assassinate Jewish informers and police officers. Fellow resistance fighter Gusta Dawidson Draenger noted at the time that Liebeskind did not believe that the Jews would survive the Ghetto and that they were on the "path of death"; she recorded him as saying that he wanted there to be "three lines in history" that showed that Jews did not "go like sheep to slaughter" but that they had "rose up and fought for their honour".

=== December 1942 Cyganeria bombing and death ===
In November 1942, police officers unsuccessfully attempted to arrest Liebeskind. A month later, on 22 December 1942, ŻOB, alongside the People's Guard, led a coordinated attack against German targets in Kraków, including throwing grenades at a German Army mess hall, the Zakopianka officers' club, and the Cyganeria and Espalanda cafés. False calls were also made by ŻOB to emergency services to divert them away from the areas where the attack took place. Between seven and 70 German soldiers were reported to have been killed in the attacks.

German authorities led a manhunt for those involved that focused on the Kraków Ghetto. On 24 December 1942, while surrounded by German soldiers in the bunker of He-Chaluc ha-Lochem's command post at 5 Żuławski Street, Liebeskind was killed. His death was due to a gunshot, though it has been variously reported that he was killed by German soldiers, or that he died by suicide to avoid being captured.

=== Aftermath ===
The leadership of Jewish resistance in the Kraków Ghetto ruptured after the deaths of Liebeskind and other leaders including Dränger and Dawidson Draenger. Some captured members shared information about the resistance while being tortured, further weakening the resistance. By March 1943, all the Jews in the Ghetto had been either deported Belzec extermination camp, Auschwitz concentration camp or Kraków-Płaszów concentration camp (where many of them would be murdered), or killed on the strets of the Ghetto Trawniki men.

Liebeskind's wife Rebeka was deported to Auschwitz on 19 January 1943. She did not learn of her husband's death until after her deportation. She survived the war and moved to Kibbutz Maaysan Zvi in Israel, where she remarried. Liebeskind's sister, Miriam ("Mira"), also a member of the resistance, was captured and executed after being caught recruiting to the movement in Radom.

In 1945, Liebeskind received an award from the Polish Land Forces. It was presented to his wife in 1967. Yitzhak Zuckerman, while against the operation at Cygneria, retrospectively recognised its importance and expressed appreciation for Liebeskind and others.

A street is named after Liebeskind in Netanya.
