= Gmina Zabierzów =

Gmina Zabierzów Zabierzów Commune
- Gmina
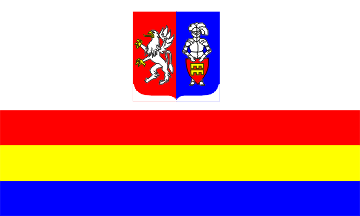
- Flag Coat of arms
- Interactive map of Gmina Zabierzów
- Coordinates (Zabierzów): 50°7′5″N 19°46′47″E
- Country: Poland
- Voivodeship: Lesser Poland
- County: Kraków County
- Seat: Zabierzów

Area
  - Total: 99.59 km^{2} (38.45 sq mi)

Population (2006)
  - Total: 22,387
  - Density: 224.8/km^{2} (582.2/sq mi)
- Website: http://www.zabierzow.org.pl/

Gmina Zabierzów is a rural gmina (administrative district) in Kraków County, Lesser Poland Voivodeship, in southern Poland. Its seat is the village of Zabierzów, which lies approximately 13 kilometres (8 mi) north-west of the regional capital Kraków.

The gmina covers an area of 99.59 square kilometres (38.5 sq mi), and as of 2006 its total population is 22,387.

The gmina contains part of the protected area called Kraków Valleys Landscape Park.

== Villages ==
Gmina Zabierzów contains the villages and settlements of Aleksandrowice, Balice, Bolechowice, Brzezie, Brzezinka, Brzoskwinia, Burów, Karniowice, Kleszczów, Kobylany, Kochanów, Młynka, Niegoszowice, Nielepice, Pisary, Radwanowice, Rudawa, Rząska, Szczyglice, Ujazd, Więckowice, Zabierzów and Zelków.

== Neighbouring gminas ==
Gmina Zabierzów is bordered by the city of Kraków and by the gminas of Jerzmanowice-Przeginia, Krzeszowice, Liszki and Wielka Wieś.

== Coat of arms ==
Blazon: a Modern French shield per pale gules and azure, on the first a griffon segreant argent armed, beaked and langued Or, on the second a human figure fully armoured argent holding a heater shield gules charged with two labels Or of three points arranged in pale.
