= Kleszczów, Lesser Poland Voivodeship =

Kleszczów
- Village
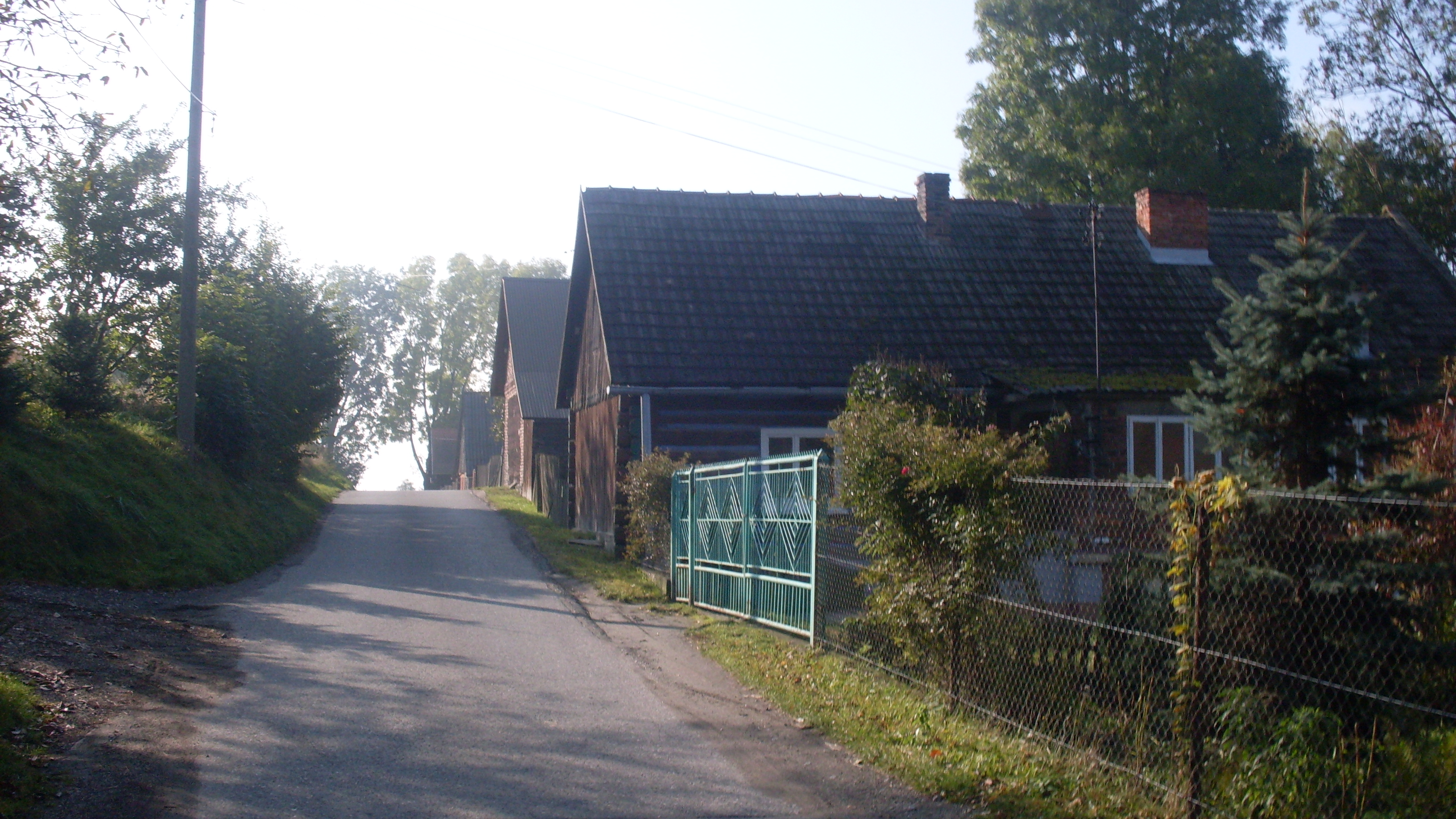

- Location within Poland
- Coordinates: 50°6′N 19°45′E
- Country: Poland
- Voivodeship: Lesser Poland
- County: Kraków
- Gmina: Zabierzów
- Population: 307

Kleszczów [ˈklɛʂt͡ʂuf] is a village in the administrative district of Gmina Zabierzów, within Kraków County, Lesser Poland Voivodeship, in southern Poland.
