= Niegoszowice =

- Village
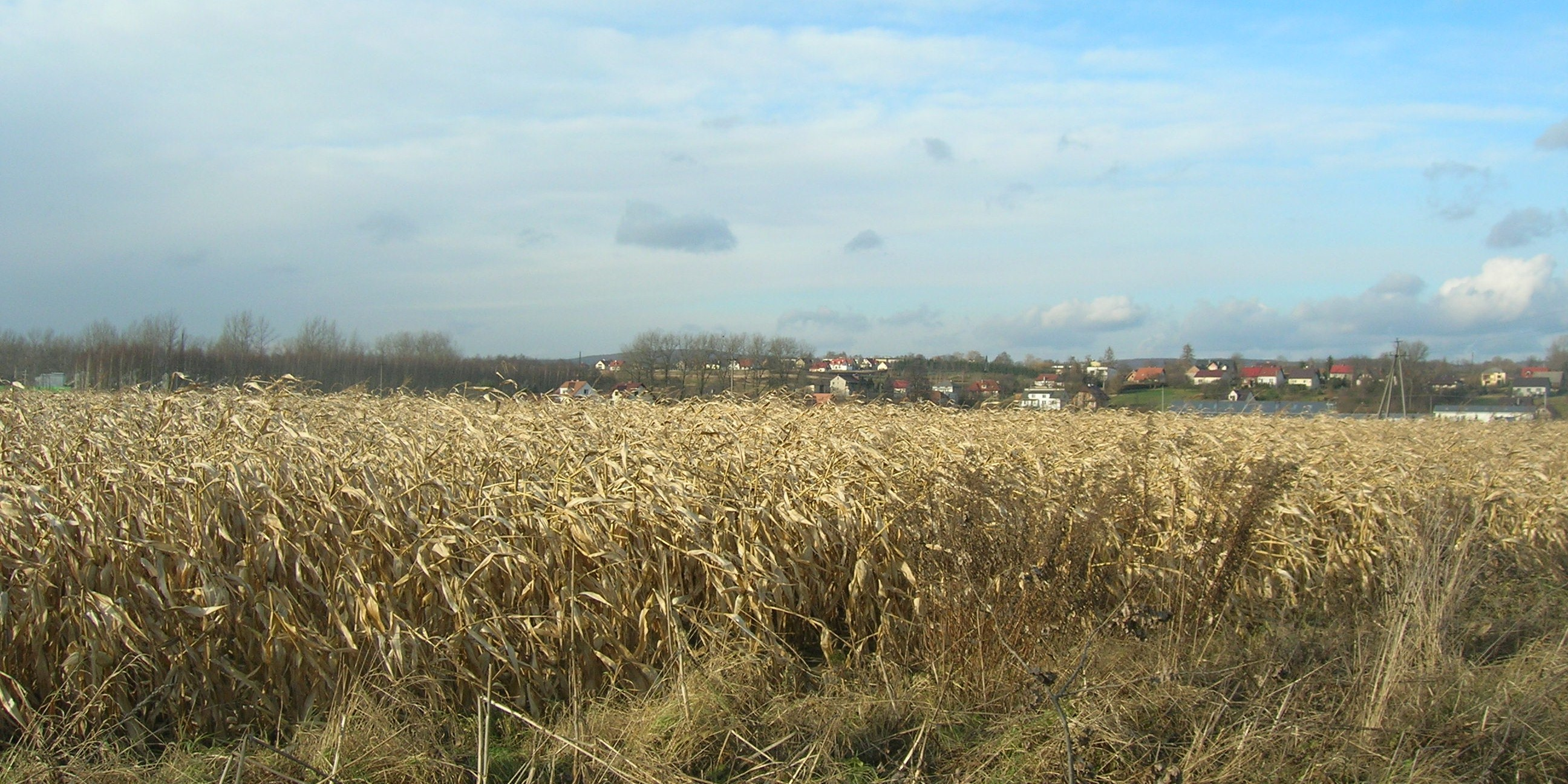

- Location within Poland
- Coordinates: 50°7′N 19°44′E
- Country: Poland
- Voivodeship: Lesser Poland
- County: Kraków
- Gmina: Zabierzów
- Elevation: 250 m (820 ft)
- Population: 470

Niegoszowice [ɲɛɡɔʂɔˈvit͡sɛ] is a village in the administrative district of Gmina Zabierzów, within Kraków County, Lesser Poland Voivodeship, in southern Poland.
