= Aleksandrowice, Lesser Poland Voivodeship =

Aleksandrowice
- Village
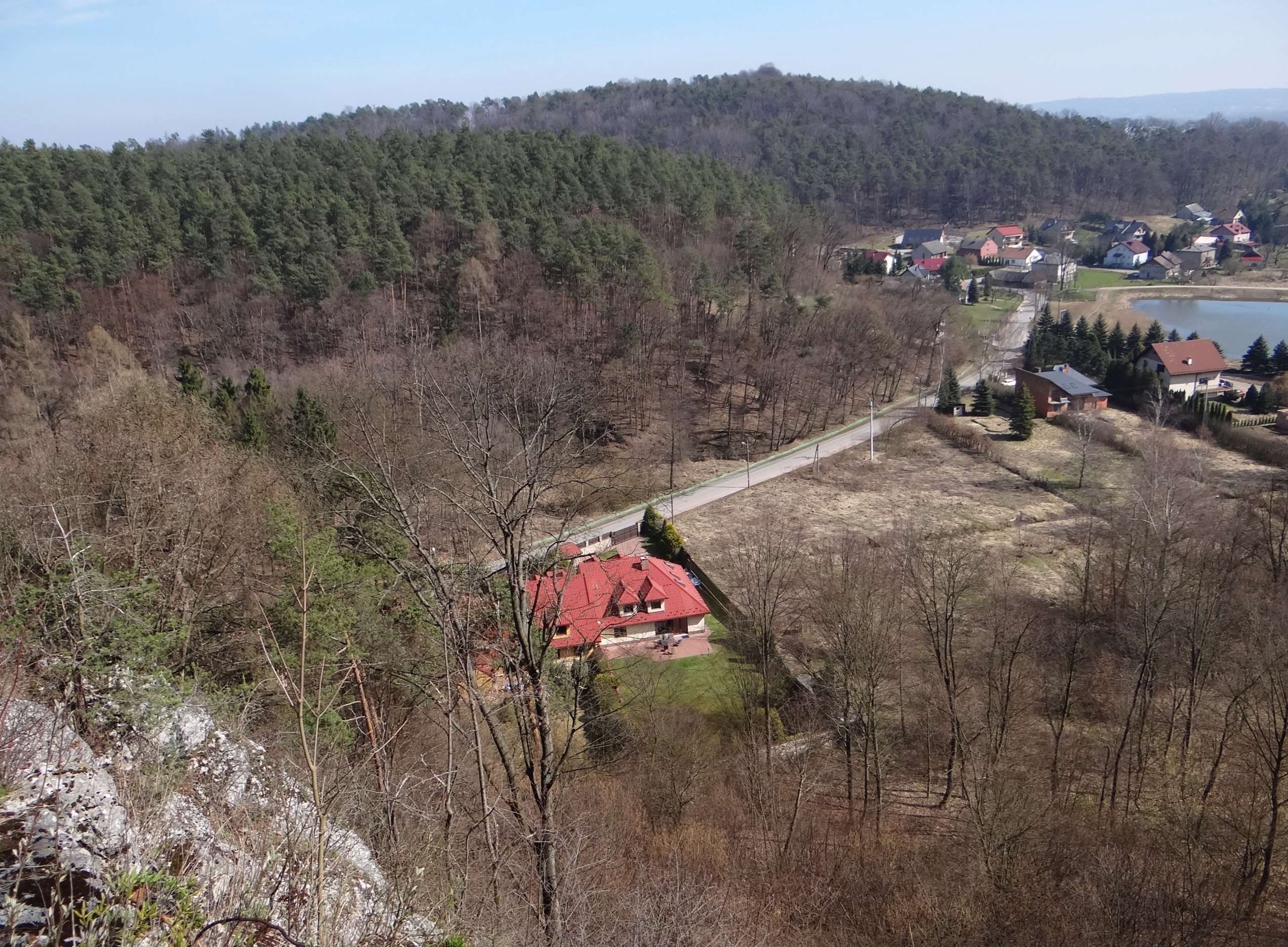

- Location within Poland
- Coordinates: 50°5′N 19°46′E
- Country: Poland
- Voivodeship: Lesser Poland
- County: Kraków
- Gmina: Zabierzów
- Population: 726

Aleksandrowice [alɛksandrɔˈvit͡sɛ] is a village in the administrative district of Gmina Zabierzów, within Kraków County, Lesser Poland Voivodeship, in southern Poland.

== Geography ==
=== Climate ===
Climate in this area has mild differences between highs and lows, and there is adequate rainfall year-round. The Köppen Climate Classification subtype for this climate is "Cfb". (Marine West Coast Climate).

Climate data for Aleksandrowice
Month	Jan	Feb	Mar	Apr	May	Jun	Jul	Aug	Sep	Oct	Nov	Dec	Year
Mean daily maximum °C (°F)	7 (44)	9 (48)	17 (62)	22 (71)	26 (78)	29 (84)	30 (86)	30 (86)	27 (80)	22 (71)	15 (59)	10 (50)	20 (68)
Daily mean °C (°F)	−4 (24)	−2 (28)	2 (35)	8 (46)	13 (55)	16 (60)	18 (64)	17 (62)	13 (55)	8 (46)	3 (37)	−1 (30)	7 (44)
Mean daily minimum °C (°F)	−18 (0)	−15 (5)	−10 (14)	−3 (26)	0 (32)	4 (39)	7 (44)	6 (42)	1 (33)	−3 (26)	−7 (19)	−14 (6)	−4 (24)
Average precipitation mm (inches)	33 (1.3)	30 (1.2)	33 (1.3)	48 (1.9)	79 (3.1)	91 (3.6)	86 (3.4)	84 (3.3)	53 (2.1)	43 (1.7)	41 (1.6)	38 (1.5)	660 (26.1)
Source: Weatherbase
