= Brzezie, Kraków County =

Brzezie
- Village
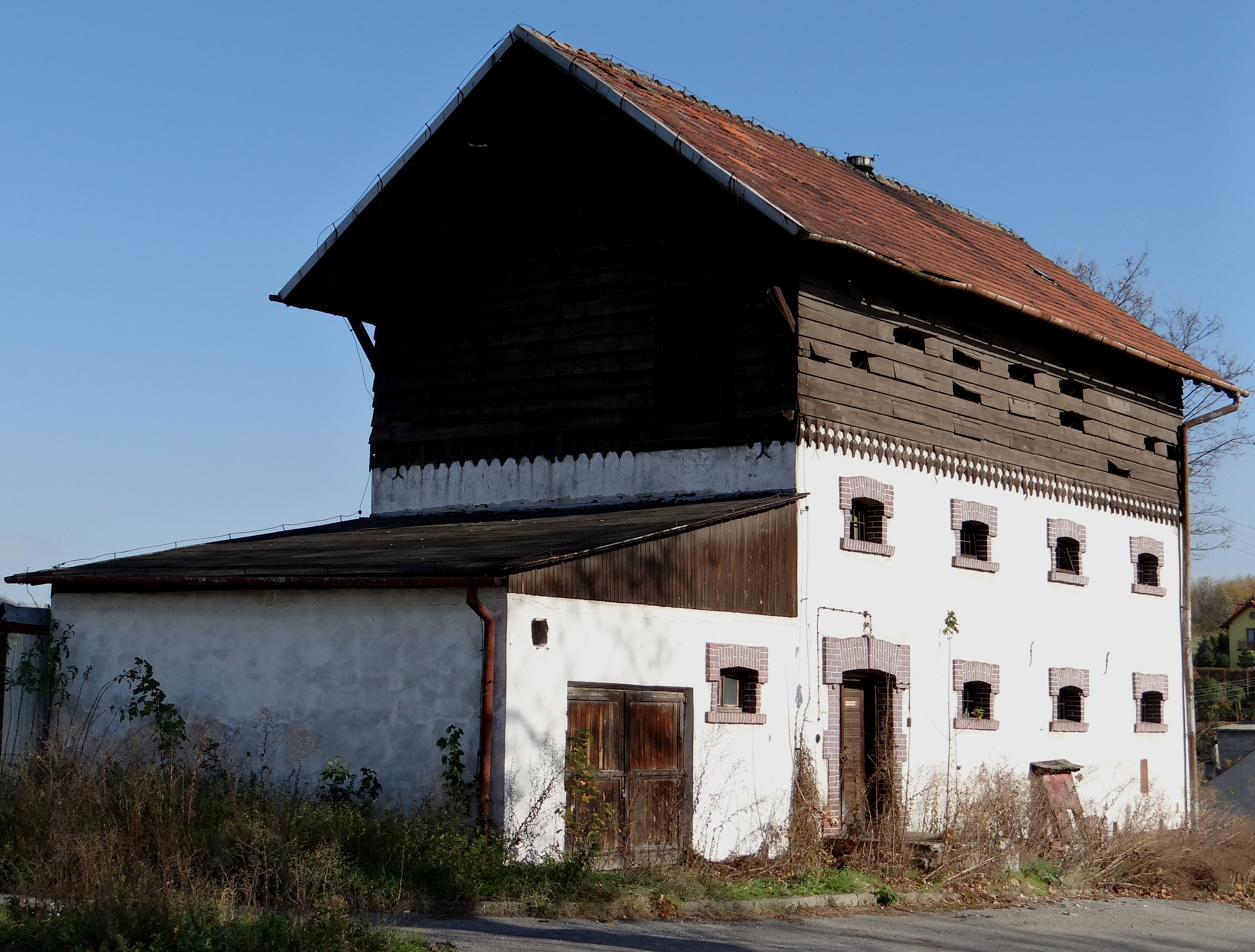

- Location within Poland
- Coordinates: 50°7′N 19°50′E
- Country: Poland
- Voivodeship: Lesser Poland
- County: Kraków
- Gmina: Zabierzów
- Population: 820

Brzezie [ˈbʐɛʑɛ] is a village in the administrative district of Gmina Zabierzów, within Kraków County, Lesser Poland Voivodeship, in southern Poland.
