= Radwanowice =

- Village
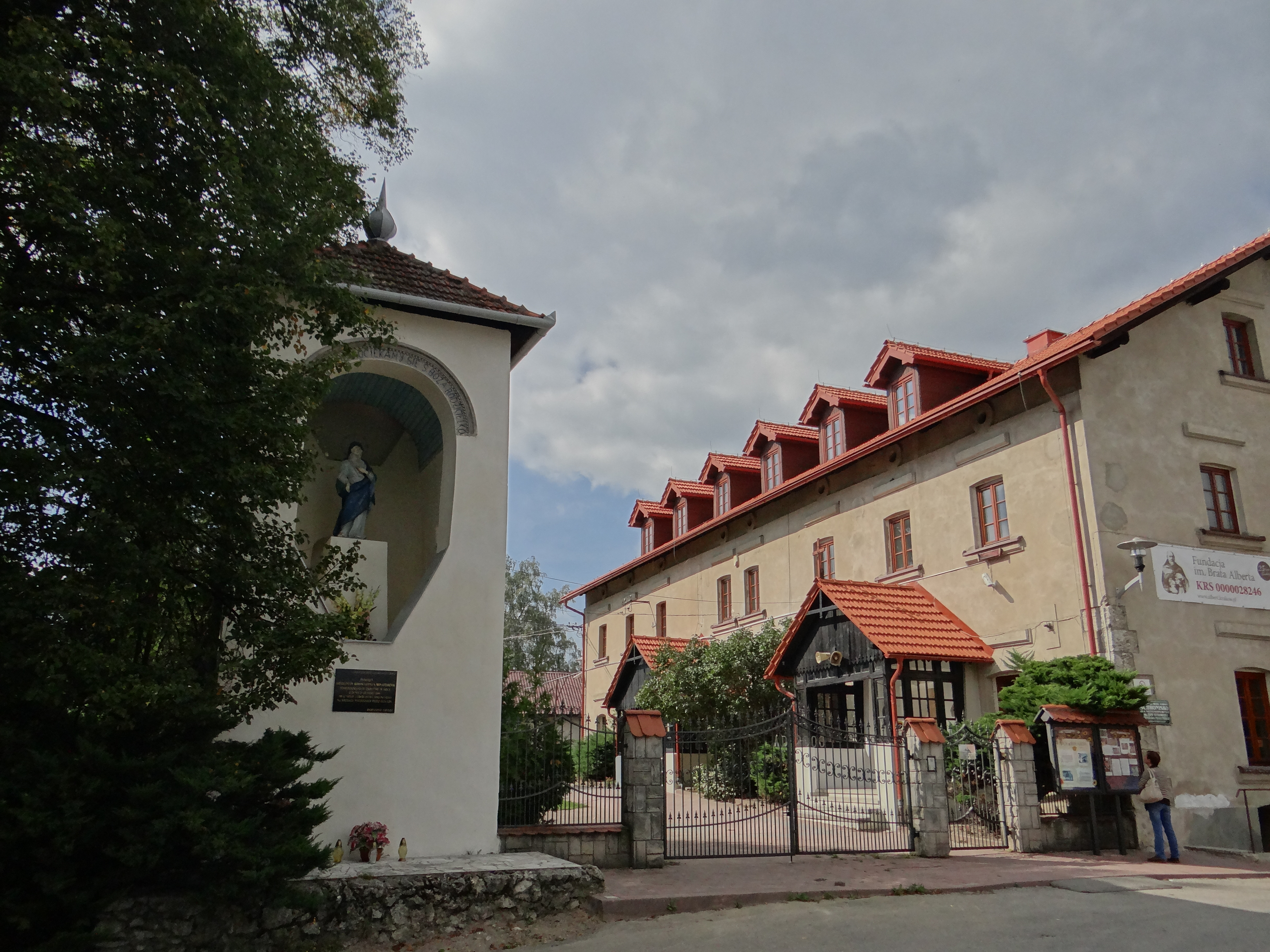
- Manor house

- Location within Poland
- Coordinates: 50°7′N 19°44′E
- Country: Poland
- Voivodeship: Lesser Poland
- County: Kraków
- Gmina: Zabierzów
- Population: 590

Radwanowice [radvanɔˈvit͡sɛ] is a village in the administrative district of Gmina Zabierzów, within Kraków County, Lesser Poland Voivodeship, in southern Poland. The village is located in the historical region Galicia.
