= Trątnowice =

- Village
- Location within Poland
- Coordinates: 50°12′18″N 20°07′11″E
- Country: Poland
- Voivodeship: Lesser Poland
- County: Kraków County
- Gmina: Słomniki
- Elevation: 257 m (843 ft)

Population (2021)
  - Total: 244
- Postal code: 32-090
- Area code: +48 12
- Vehicle registration: KRA

Trątnowice is a village in Poland, in Lesser Poland Voivodeship, in Kraków County, within Gmina Słomniki. Geographically, the village lies in the Miechów Upland, at an elevation of approximately 257 metres (843 ft) above sea level.

Integral parts of the village:

- Kolonie Trątnowskie
- Nadział
- Stara Wieś

Trątnowice borders the following localities:

- Niedźwiedź
- Szczepanowice
- Czechy
- Skrzeszowice

== History ==
=== Middle Ages ===
The oldest documented mention of the village dates from 1279. In a document issued by Duke Bolesław V the Chaste confirming the possessions of the Poor Clares in Grodzisko, the village is listed under the name Trantnowice. The duke then permitted the resettlement of service population from Goszcza to the village (as well as to Wierzbno).

At the turn of the 14th and 15th centuries, part of the village passed into the hands of the powerful Szafraniec family of the Starykoń coat of arms, owners of, among others, Pieskowa Skała and the nearby village of Łuczyce. In 1400, the brothers Wojtek and Jakub (the latter still a minor) and Wichna, Wojtek's wife, sold their entire share in Trątnowice for 80 grzywnas of Prague groschen to the Kraków canon Jan Szafraniec – later rector of the University of Kraków, Bishop of Włocławek and Chancellor of the Kingdom.

In 1402, the Szafraniec brothers – Jan (canon and custodian of Kraków), Piotr (Podstoli of Kraków), Stanisław of Młodziejowice and Tomasz of Łuczyce – donated their share of Trątnowice to the University of Kraków to endow a lectureship at the Faculty of Liberal Arts. The foundation was linked to an altarage at the altar of St. Bartholomew in Wawel Cathedral; the first holder of the altarage, appointed in 1406, was Master Jan of Kluczbork. The altarist was at the same time a lecturer at the university, and the eldest member of the Szafraniec family had the right to choose him from two candidates presented by the rector. In 1412, the foundation was extended to include the village of Podstolice.

At that time the village had several owners. In 1432, in a lawsuit brought by Stanisław Młodziejowski concerning the peasant Jan Borowiec, the defendant was Święszek of Trątnowice, steward of the Archdeacon of Kraków; the court ordered him to return the peasant to Młodziejowski.

=== Early modern period ===
In the 17th century, Trątnowice belonged to the parish of Niedźwiedź. Its parish registers record, among others, the family of Sebastian and Regina Ormianek, whose daughter Jadwiga was born in Trątnowice on 30 November 1642. The surname is sometimes interpreted as a trace of settlers of Armenian origin among the peasantry around Kraków, although the family's origin is uncertain. The same registers record the peasant family of Wojciech and Anna Przenieśło of Trątnowice between 1666 and 1679.

=== 19th and 20th centuries ===
In the 19th century, a manor farm (folwark) operated in Trątnowice. In the local manor house, on 2 October 1880, Edward Kopciński was born – a painter and teacher, a student of Teodor Axentowicz and Józef Mehoffer.

During World War I, in November 1914, fighting between Russian and Austro-Hungarian troops took place near the village as part of the Battle of Kraków. A remnant of these events is a war grave in the form of an earthen mound, located in the fields near property no. 12. It most likely contains the remains of 24 soldiers of the Imperial Russian Army and one soldier of the Austro-Hungarian Army.

From 1975 to 1998, the village administratively belonged to the former Kraków Voivodeship.

== Volunteer Fire Brigade ==
The village has a unit of the Volunteer Fire Brigade (Ochotnicza Straż Pożarna, OSP Trątnowice), operating as an association. The unit is not part of the National Firefighting and Rescue System (KSRG) and plays a supporting role in the fire protection system of Gmina Słomniki.

Although firefighting traditions in the village date back to the mid-20th century, the unit obtained its current legal form on 29 May 2001, when it was officially entered into the National Court Register (KRS).

A significant event in the unit's recent history came in 2021, when the OSP acquired a newer fire engine. With funds from the budget of Gmina Słomniki, a light reconnaissance and rescue vehicle, a Ford Transit, was purchased; it had previously served with the OSP unit in Sulisławice. It replaced worn-out equipment and increased the unit's mobility.

The fire station (at number 62) is the centre of the village's social life, serving as a venue for residents' meetings and cultural events.

== Sport and recreation ==
In 1946, the football club LKS "Trątnowianka" Trątnowice was founded in the village. Over the years, the team has competed in leagues run by the Lesser Poland Football Association, playing among others in Class B (Kraków I group) and Class C.

The village also has a playground for young children.

== Education ==
Pupils from the village are taken by school bus to the Tadeusz Kościuszko Primary School in Niedźwiedź.

== Religion ==
Roman Catholic residents belong to the Diocese of Kielce (parish of St. Adalbert in Niedźwiedź).
