= Pobiednik =

Pobiednik can refer to two villages near each other in the administrative district of Gmina Igołomia-Wawrzeńczyce, Kraków County, Lesser Poland Voivodeship, southern Poland:

- Pobiednik Wielki
- Pobiednik Mały
