= Iwo Odrowąż =

Polish humanist, statesman and bishop

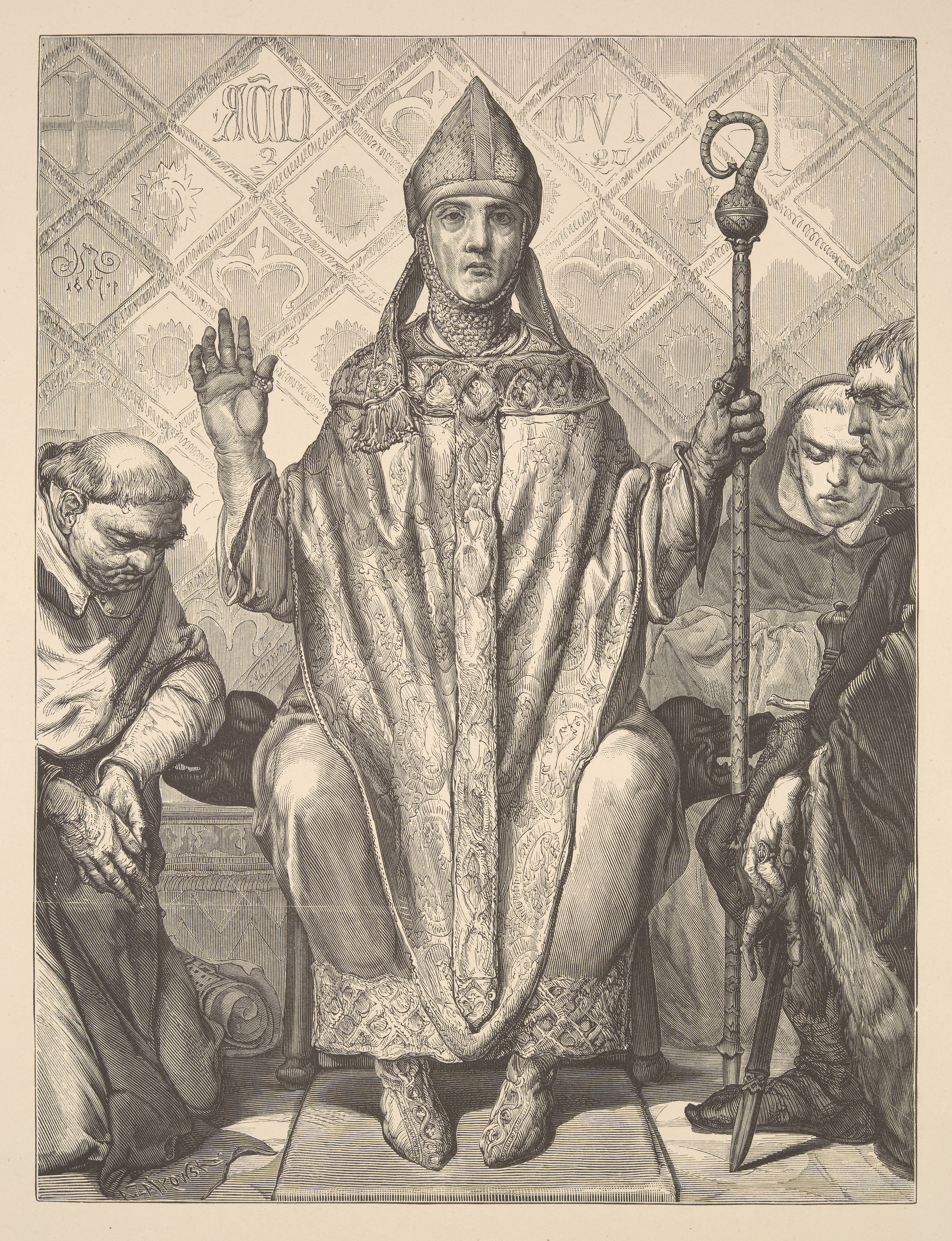
Iwo Odrowąż

Iwo Odrowąż (died 21 August 1229) was a medieval Polish humanist, statesman, and bishop.

== Life ==
Iwo was very probably born in Końskie, son of Szaweł Odrowąż and a member of the noble family of Odrowąż. He studied in Bologna and Paris, maintained contacts with a number of Western European intellectuals, and developed for himself a reputation as a "splendid representative of medieval Latin culture", though no writings of his survive.

He later served as chancellor to Leszek I the White from 1206 to 1218, and as Bishop of Kraków from 1218 to 1229. Although designated by Pope Honorius III in 1219 as archbishop of Gniezno, he refused to accept the appointment.

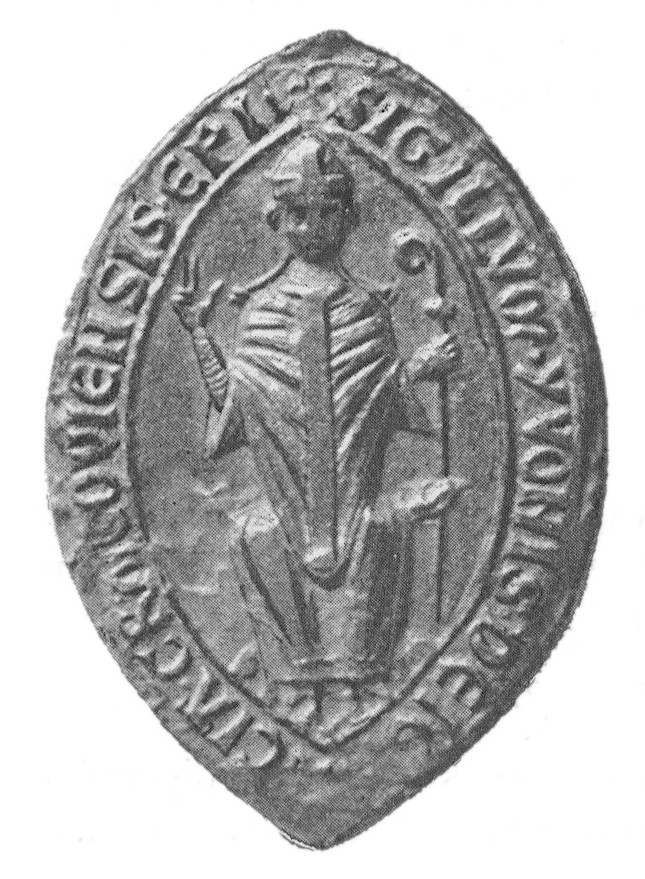
Seal of Iwo Odrowąż

While chancellor he encouraged the reforms of Pope Innocent III. In 1215, he took part in the Fourth Lateran Council together with Archbishop Henryk Kietlicz. After the death of Leszek he supported Henry I the Bearded against Konrad I of Masovia.

In the years 1220–1224 while he was Bishop of Kraków, he built a church dedicated to Saint Nicholas in the village of Końskie and established a parish there. In 1229 he funded a church in Daleszyce.

In 1223, thanks to his endeavours, the Dominican Order sent friars from Bologna to Kraków, the first Dominican presence in Poland, with the first Polish Dominican friar Jacek Odrowąż, his kinsman, who in the year 1594 was canonised as Saint Hyacinth of Poland. In 1220 Iwo brought the Order of the Holy Ghost (Ordo Fratrum Canonicorum Regularium Sancti Spiritus de Saxia) to Prądnik Biały, where he entrusted them with the care of the hospital.

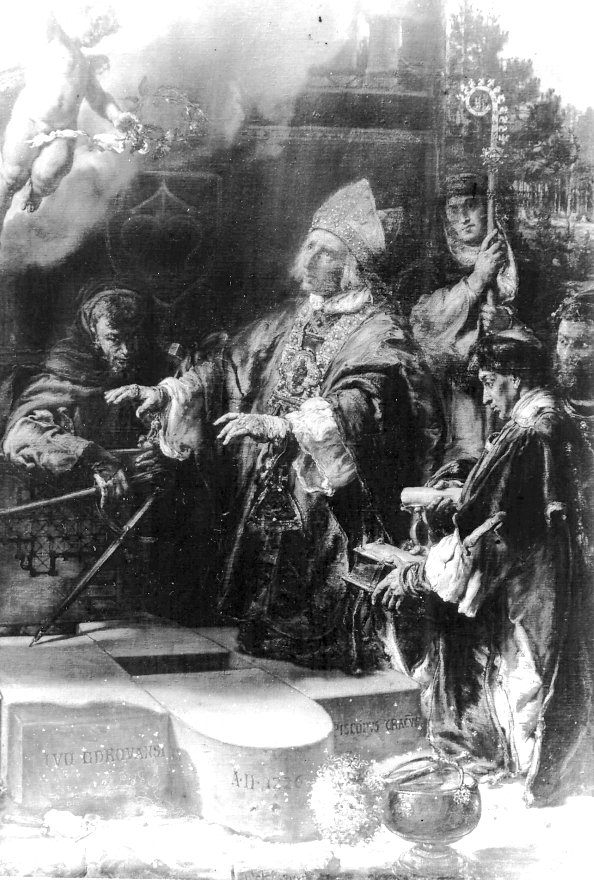
"Bishop Iwo Odrowąż blesses foundation stone of the church in Iwonicz in 1226", by Jan Matejko

Iwo is thought to be the probable founder of the church in Wysocice at the beginning of the 13th century. In 1222 in Kacice near Słomniki he established a Cistercian monastery, which later moved to Mogiła near Kraków and became known as Mogiła Abbey. He developed campaigns for settlement on the estates of the bishops of Kraków. He provided endowments for the Cistercian monasteries of Sulejów and Wąchock as well as the Premonstratensian monasteries in Hebdów and Imbramowice, an ancestral foundation of the Odrowąż family, where the bishop's sister was abbess. He also founded two churches in Kraków: the Church of the Holy Spirit and the Church of the Holy Cross.

He died near Modena, Italy, while on a visit. His remains, through the agency of Wincenty of Kielcza, a family connection, were buried in the Dominican church in Kraków (now the Basilica of the Holy Trinity, Kraków).

Iwo was the owner of the oldest known Polish private library (containing 32 codices purchased abroad), which he left in his will to Wawel Cathedral.

== Bibliography ==
- Kościół SS. Norbertanek w Imbramowicach pod wezwaniem św. Apostołów Piotra i Pawła. Wydane przez SS. Norbertanki.
