= Cianowice Małe =

- Village
- Location within Poland
- Coordinates: 50°11′55″N 19°52′24″E
- Country: Poland
- Voivodeship: Lesser Poland
- County: Kraków
- Gmina: Skała

Cianowice Małe [t͡ɕanɔˈvit͡sɛ ˈmawɛ] is a former village in the administrative unit of Gmina Skała, within Kraków County, Lesser Poland Voivodeship, in southern Poland.

The locality is currently (2026) part of the village of Cianowice.
