= Wesoła, Lesser Poland Voivodeship =

Wesoła
- Village
- Location within Poland
- Coordinates: 50°13′32″N 20°2′54″E
- Country: Poland
- Voivodeship: Lesser Poland
- County: Kraków
- Gmina: Słomniki
- Population: 153

Wesoła [vɛˈsɔwa] is a village in the administrative district of Gmina Słomniki, within Kraków County, Lesser Poland Voivodeship, in southern Poland.
