= Zamłynie, Lesser Poland Voivodeship =

Zamłynie
- Village
- Location within Poland
- Coordinates: 50°10′09″N 19°55′18″E
- Country: Poland
- Voivodeship: Lesser Poland
- County: Kraków
- Gmina: Skała

Zamłynie [zamˈwɨɲɛ] is a village in the administrative district of Gmina Skała, within Kraków County, Lesser Poland Voivodeship, in southern Poland.
