= Tropiszów =

- Village
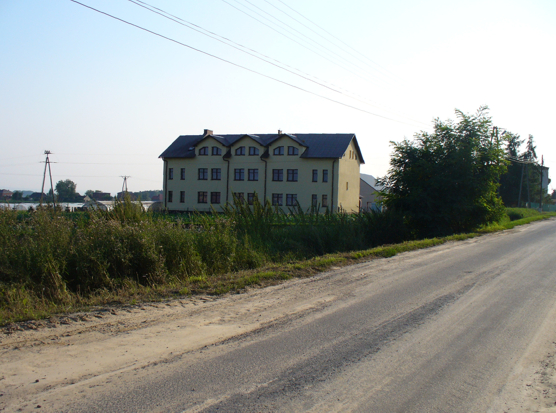

- Location within Poland
- Coordinates: 50°6′24″N 20°12′5″E
- Country: Poland
- Voivodeship: Lesser Poland
- County: Kraków
- Gmina: Igołomia-Wawrzeńczyce
- Population: 770

Tropiszów [trɔˈpiʂuf] is a village in the administrative district of Gmina Igołomia-Wawrzeńczyce, within Kraków County, Lesser Poland Voivodeship, in southern Poland.
