= Wielmoża =

- Village
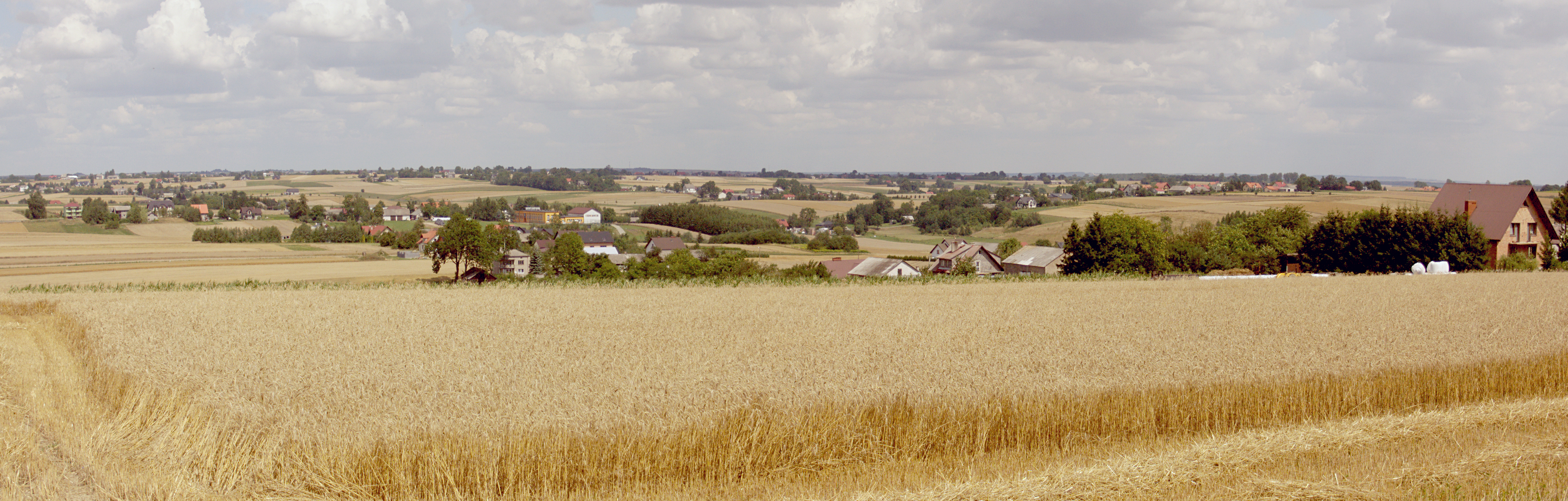
- Panoramic view of the village

- Location within Poland
- Coordinates: 50°16′N 19°49′E
- Country: Poland
- Voivodeship: Lesser Poland
- County: Kraków
- Gmina: Sułoszowa

Population
  - Total: 1,500

Wielmoża [vjɛlˈmɔʐa] is a village in the administrative district of Gmina Sułoszowa, within Kraków County, Lesser Poland Voivodeship, in southern Poland.
