= Rzeplin =

Rzeplin may refer to the following places in Poland:

- Rzeplin, Lower Silesian Voivodeship (south-west Poland)
- Rzeplin, Lesser Poland Voivodeship (south Poland)
- Rzeplin, Lublin Voivodeship (east Poland)
- Rzeplin, Subcarpathian Voivodeship (south-east Poland)
