= Polanowice =

Polanowice may refer to the following villages in Poland:

- Polanowice, Lesser Poland Voivodeship (south Poland)
- Polanowice, Lubusz Voivodeship (west Poland)
- Polanowice, Opole Voivodeship (south-west Poland)
- Polanowice, Kuyavian-Pomeranian Voivodeship (central Poland)
