= Waganowice =

- Village
- Location within Poland
- Coordinates: 50°13′54″N 20°8′8″E
- Country: Poland
- Voivodeship: Lesser Poland
- County: Kraków
- Gmina: Słomniki
- Population: 290

Waganowice [vaɡanɔˈvit͡sɛ] is a village in the administrative district of Gmina Słomniki, within Kraków County, Lesser Poland Voivodeship, in southern Poland.
