= Rzeszotary Górne =

- Village
- Location within Poland
- Coordinates: 49°56′53″N 19°58′20″E
- Country: Poland
- Voivodeship: Lesser Poland
- County: Kraków
- Gmina: Świątniki Górne

Rzeszotary Górne [ʐɛʂɔˈtarɨ ˈɡurnɛ] is a village in the administrative district of Gmina Świątniki Górne, within Kraków County, Lesser Poland Voivodeship, in southern Poland.
