= Poręba Laskowska =

- Village
- Location within Poland
- Coordinates: 50°15′N 19°55′E
- Country: Poland
- Voivodeship: Lesser Poland
- County: Kraków
- Gmina: Skała
- Population: 140

Poręba Laskowska [pɔˈrɛmba lasˈkɔfska] is a village in the administrative district of Gmina Skała, within Kraków County, Lesser Poland Voivodeship, in southern Poland.
