= Wygnanów, Lesser Poland Voivodeship =

Wygnanów
- Village
- Location within Poland
- Coordinates: 50°7′9″N 20°18′50″E
- Country: Poland
- Voivodeship: Lesser Poland
- County: Kraków
- Gmina: Igołomia-Wawrzeńczyce
- Population (approx.): 54

Wygnanów [vɨɡˈnanuf] is a village in the administrative district of Gmina Igołomia-Wawrzeńczyce, within Kraków County, Lesser Poland Voivodeship, in southern Poland.

The village has an approximate population of 54.
