= Stoki, Lesser Poland Voivodeship =

Stoki, Poland
- Village
- Location within Poland
- Coordinates: 50°13′16″N 19°53′09″E
- Country: Poland
- Voivodeship: Lesser Poland
- County: Kraków
- Gmina: Skała

Stoki [ˈstɔki] is a village in the administrative district of Gmina Skała, within Kraków County, Lesser Poland Voivodeship, in southern Poland.
