= Prandocin-Iły =

- Village
- Location within Poland
- Coordinates: 50°16′45″N 20°6′8″E
- Country: Poland
- Voivodeship: Lesser Poland
- County: Kraków
- Gmina: Słomniki
- Population: 403

Prandocin-Iły [pranˈdɔt͡ɕin ˈiwɨ] is a village in the administrative district of Gmina Słomniki, within Kraków County, Lesser Poland Voivodeship, in southern Poland.
