= Stręgoborzyce =

- Village
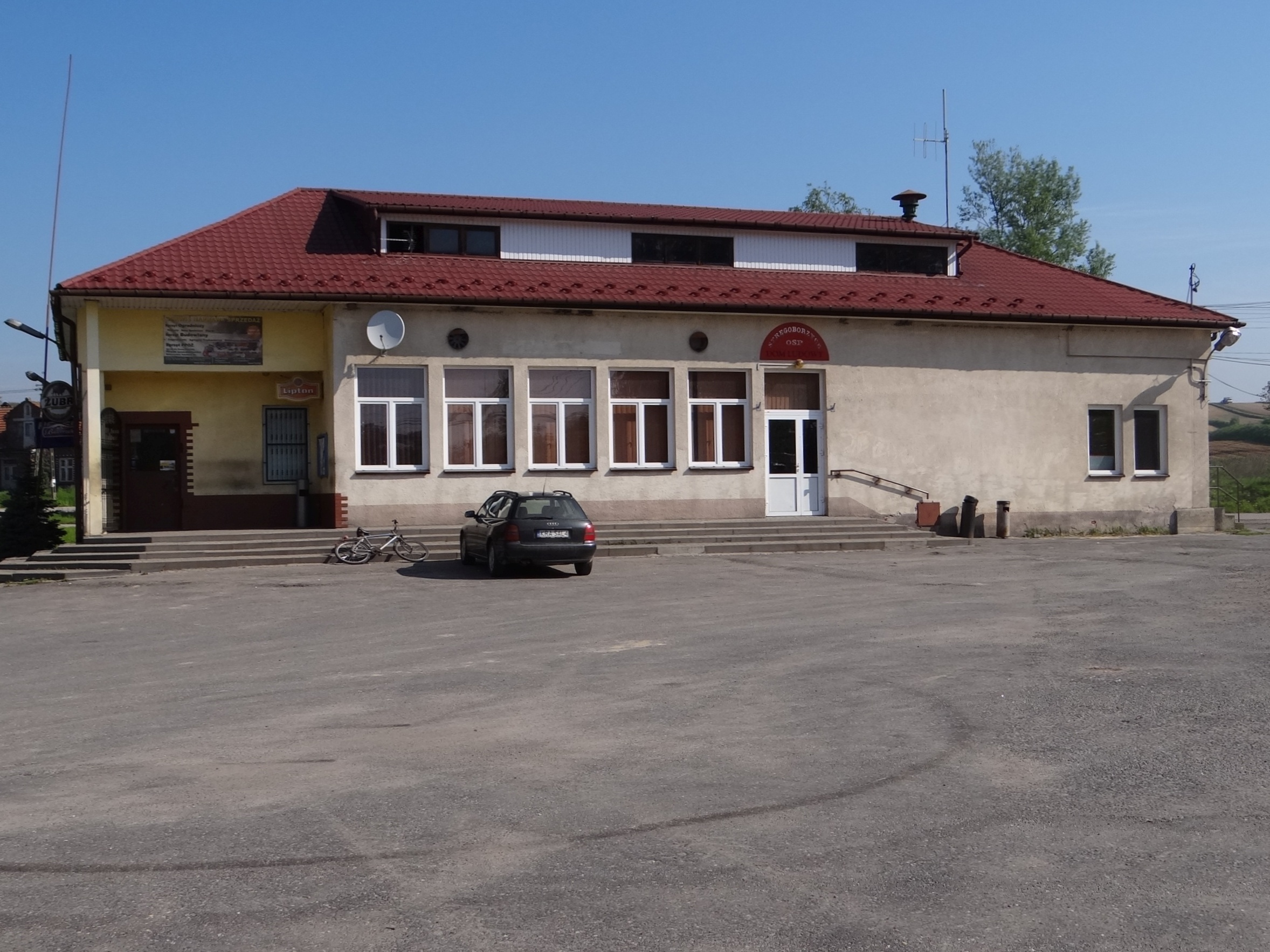

- Location within Poland
- Coordinates: 50°7′35″N 20°17′46″E
- Country: Poland
- Voivodeship: Lesser Poland
- County: Kraków
- Gmina: Igołomia-Wawrzeńczyce
- Population: 420

Stręgoborzyce [strɛŋɡɔbɔˈʐɨt͡sɛ] is a village in the administrative district of Gmina Igołomia-Wawrzeńczyce, within Kraków County, Lesser Poland Voivodeship, in southern Poland.
