= Janikowice, Kraków County =

Janikowice
- Village
- Location within Poland
- Coordinates: 50°17′4″N 20°10′3″E
- Country: Poland
- Voivodeship: Lesser Poland
- County: Kraków
- Gmina: Słomniki
- Population: 181

Janikowice [janikɔˈvit͡sɛ] is a village in the administrative district of Gmina Słomniki, within Kraków County, Lesser Poland Voivodeship, in southern Poland.
