= Dobranowice, Kraków County =

Dobranowice
- Village
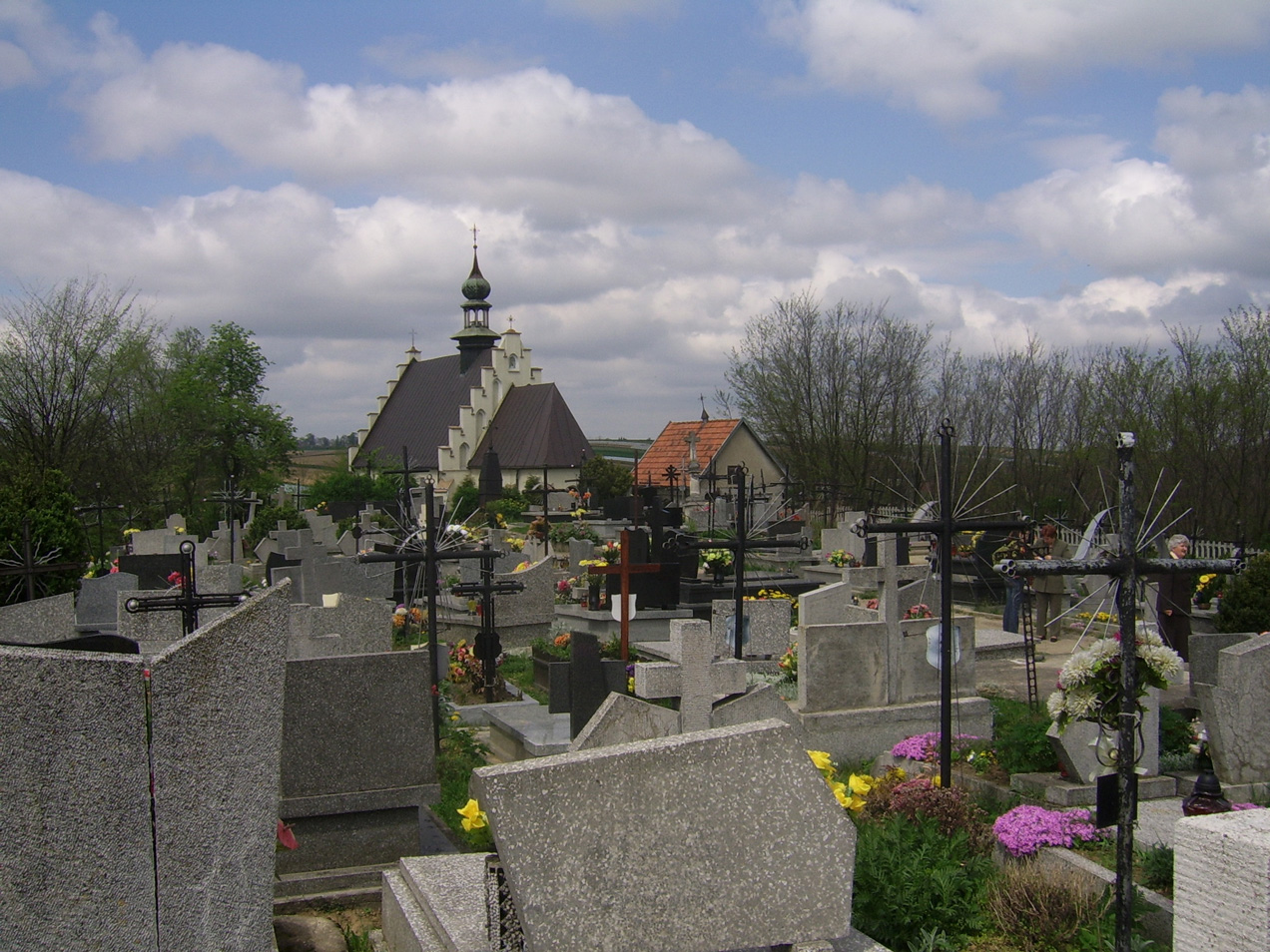

- Location within Poland
- Coordinates: 50°8′25″N 20°18′31″E
- Country: Poland
- Voivodeship: Lesser Poland
- County: Kraków
- Gmina: Igołomia-Wawrzeńczyce

Dobranowice [dɔbranɔˈvit͡sɛ] is a village in the administrative district of Gmina Igołomia-Wawrzeńczyce, within Kraków County, Lesser Poland Voivodeship, in southern Poland.
