= Rzeszotary =

Rzeszotary may refer to the following places in Poland:

- Rzeszotary, Lower Silesian Voivodeship (south-west Poland)
- Rzeszotary, Lesser Poland Voivodeship (south Poland)
