= Zagaje Smrokowskie =

- Village
- Location within Poland
- Coordinates: 50°16′23″N 20°1′13″E
- Country: Poland
- Voivodeship: Lesser Poland
- County: Kraków
- Gmina: Słomniki
- Population: 299

Zagaje Smrokowskie [zaˈɡajɛ smrɔˈkɔfskʲɛ] is a village in the administrative district of Gmina Słomniki, within Kraków County, Lesser Poland Voivodeship, in southern Poland.
