= Rudno Górne =

- Village
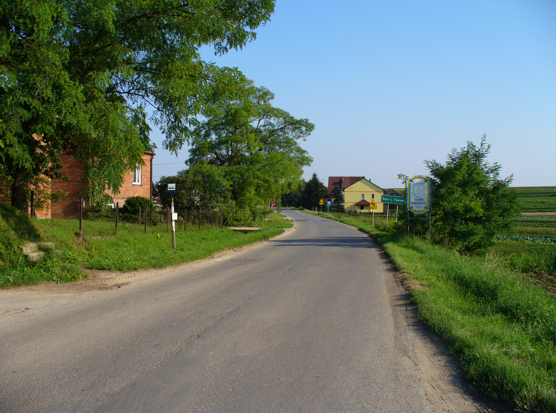

- Location within Poland
- Coordinates: 50°9′N 20°17′E
- Country: Poland
- Voivodeship: Lesser Poland
- County: Kraków
- Gmina: Igołomia-Wawrzeńczyce

Rudno Górne [ˈrudnɔ ˈɡurnɛ] is a village in the administrative district of Gmina Igołomia-Wawrzeńczyce, within Kraków County, Lesser Poland Voivodeship, in southern Poland.
