= Barbarka, Lesser Poland Voivodeship =

Village in Lesser Poland Voivodeship, Poland

Barbarka
- Village
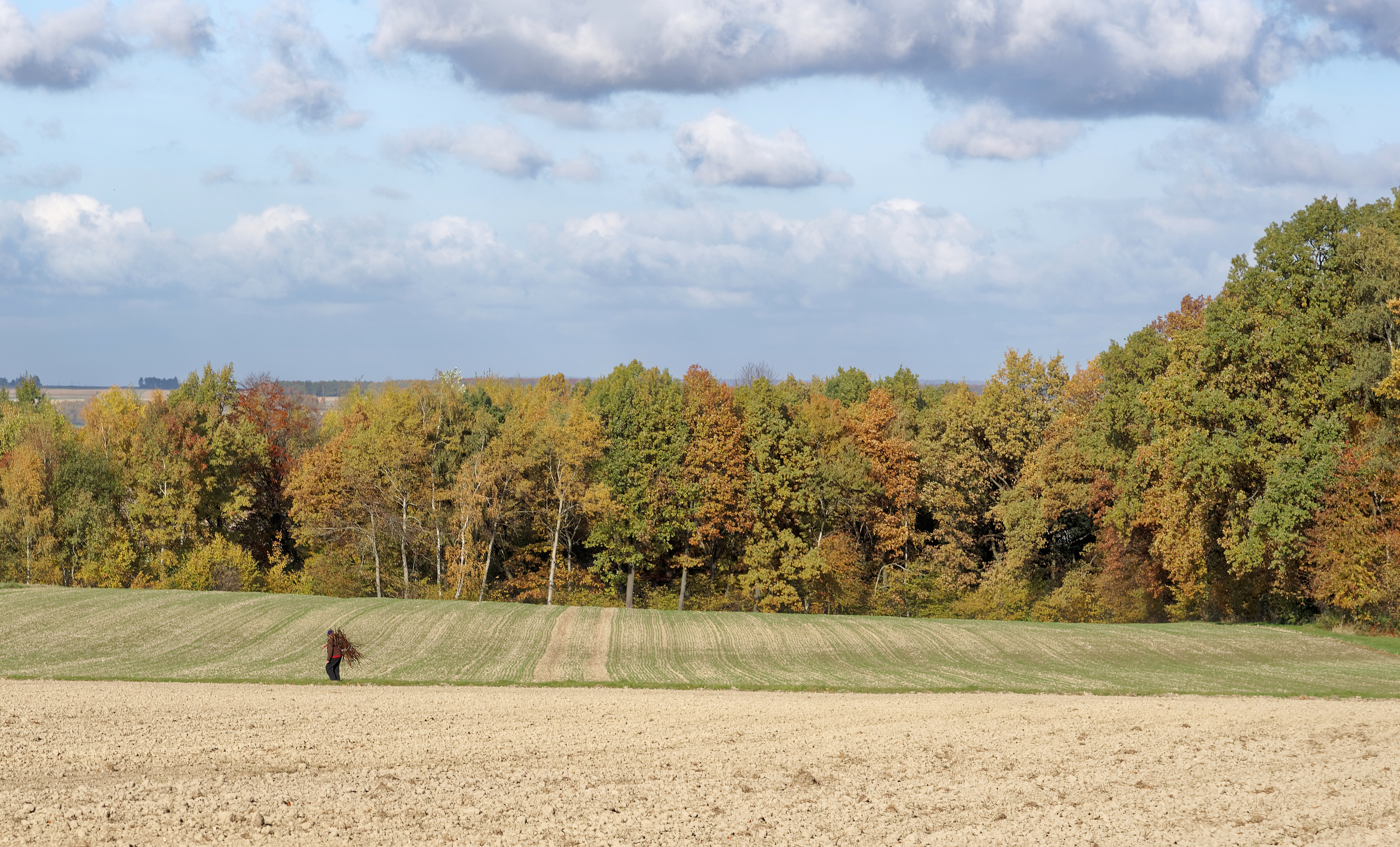

- Location within Poland
- Coordinates: 50°15′N 19°53′E
- Country: Poland
- Voivodeship: Lesser Poland
- County: Kraków
- Gmina: Skała

Population
  - Total: 210
- Time zone: UTC+1 (CET)
  - Summer (DST): UTC+2 (CEST)
- Vehicle registration: KRA

Barbarka [barˈbarka] is a village in the administrative district of Gmina Skała, within Kraków County, Lesser Poland Voivodeship, in southern Poland.
