= Prandocin-Wysiołek =

- Village
- Location within Poland
- Coordinates: 50°15′8″N 20°5′38″E
- Country: Poland
- Voivodeship: Lesser Poland
- County: Kraków
- Gmina: Słomniki
- Population: 541

Prandocin-Wysiołek [pranˈdɔt͡ɕin vɨˈɕɔwɛk] is a village in the administrative district of Gmina Słomniki, within Kraków County, Lesser Poland Voivodeship, in southern Poland.
