= Świńczów =

- Village
- Location within Poland
- Coordinates: 50°11′10″N 19°53′1″E
- Country: Poland
- Voivodeship: Lesser Poland
- County: Kraków
- Gmina: Skała

Świńczów [ˈɕfiɲt͡ʂuf] is a village in the administrative district of Gmina Skała, within Kraków County, Lesser Poland Voivodeship, in southern Poland.
