= Miłocice =

Miłocice may refer to the following places in Poland:

- Miłocice, Oława County in Lower Silesian Voivodeship (south-west Poland)
- Miłocice, Strzelin County in Lower Silesian Voivodeship (south-west Poland)
- Miłocice, Lesser Poland Voivodeship (south Poland)
- Miłocice, Pomeranian Voivodeship (north Poland)
