= Smroków =

Village in the administrative district of Gmina Słomniki

- Village
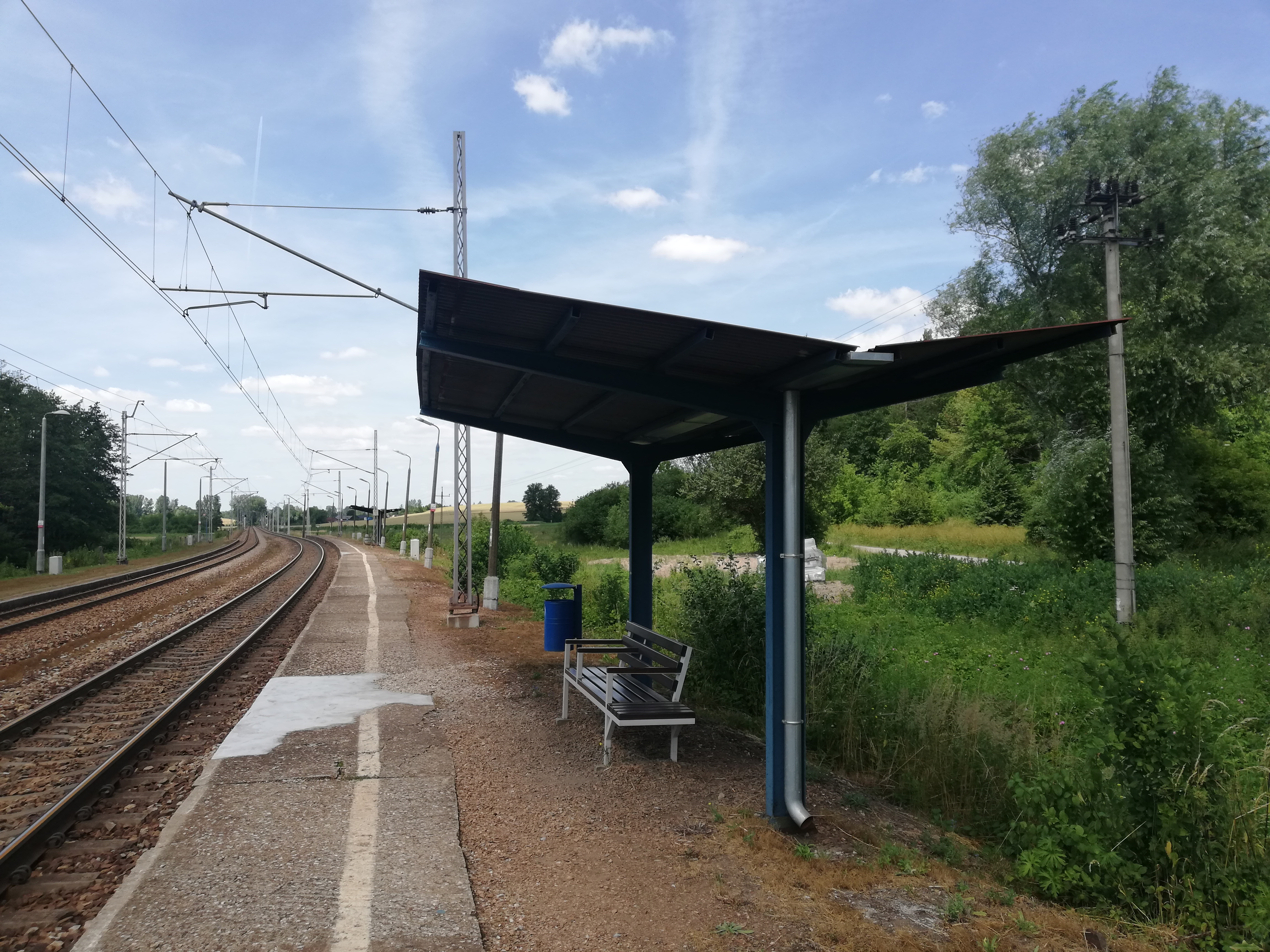
- Railway stop

- Location within Poland
- Coordinates: 50°16′52″N 20°1′58″E
- Country: Poland
- Voivodeship: Lesser Poland
- County: Kraków
- Gmina: Słomniki
- Population: 282

Smroków [ˈsmrɔkuf] is a village in the administrative district of Gmina Słomniki, within Kraków County, Lesser Poland Voivodeship, in southern Poland.
