= Sobiesęki, Lesser Poland Voivodeship =

Sobiesęki
- Village
- Location within Poland
- Coordinates: 50°14′27″N 19°51′22″E
- Country: Poland
- Voivodeship: Lesser Poland
- County: Kraków
- Gmina: Skała

Sobiesęki [sɔbjɛˈsɛŋki] is a village in the administrative district of Gmina Skała, within Kraków County, Lesser Poland Voivodeship, in southern Poland.
