= Januszowice, Gmina Słomniki =

Januszowice
- Village
- Location within Poland
- Coordinates: 50°15′48″N 20°2′51″E
- Country: Poland
- Voivodeship: Lesser Poland
- County: Kraków
- Gmina: Słomniki
- Population: 661

Januszowice [januʂɔˈvit͡sɛ] is a village in the administrative district of Gmina Słomniki, within Kraków County, Lesser Poland Voivodeship, in southern Poland.
