= Niebyła, Lesser Poland Voivodeship =

Niebyła
- Village
- Location within Poland
- Coordinates: 50°11′5″N 19°53′23″E
- Country: Poland
- Voivodeship: Lesser Poland
- County: Kraków
- Gmina: Skała
- Population: 46

Niebyła [ɲɛˈbɨwa] is a village in the administrative district of Gmina Skała, within Kraków County, Lesser Poland Voivodeship, in southern Poland.
