= Smardzowice =

- Village
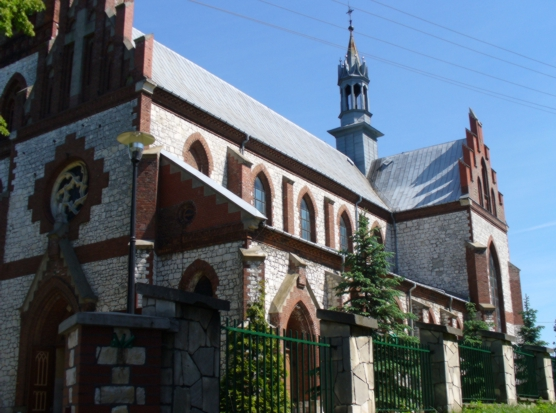
- Church

- Location within Poland
- Coordinates: 50°12′N 19°51′E
- Country: Poland
- Voivodeship: Lesser Poland
- County: Kraków
- Gmina: Skała

Smardzowice [smard͡zɔˈvit͡sɛ] is a village in the administrative district of Gmina Skała, within Kraków County, Lesser Poland Voivodeship, in southern Poland.
