= Złotniki, Lesser Poland Voivodeship =

Złotniki
- Village
- Location within Poland
- Coordinates: 50°6′N 20°16′E
- Country: Poland
- Voivodeship: Lesser Poland
- County: Kraków
- Gmina: Igołomia-Wawrzeńczyce

Złotniki [zwɔtˈniki] is a village in the administrative district of Gmina Igołomia-Wawrzeńczyce, within Kraków County, Lesser Poland Voivodeship, in southern Poland.
