= Zalesie, Gmina Świątniki Górne =

Zalesie
- Settlement
- Location within Poland
- Coordinates: 49°56′18″N 20°0′17″E
- Country: Poland
- Voivodeship: Lesser Poland
- County: Kraków
- Gmina: Świątniki Górne

Zalesie [zaˈlɛɕɛ] is a settlement in the administrative district of Gmina Świątniki Górne, within Kraków County, Lesser Poland Voivodeship, in southern Poland.
