= Ochojno =

- Village
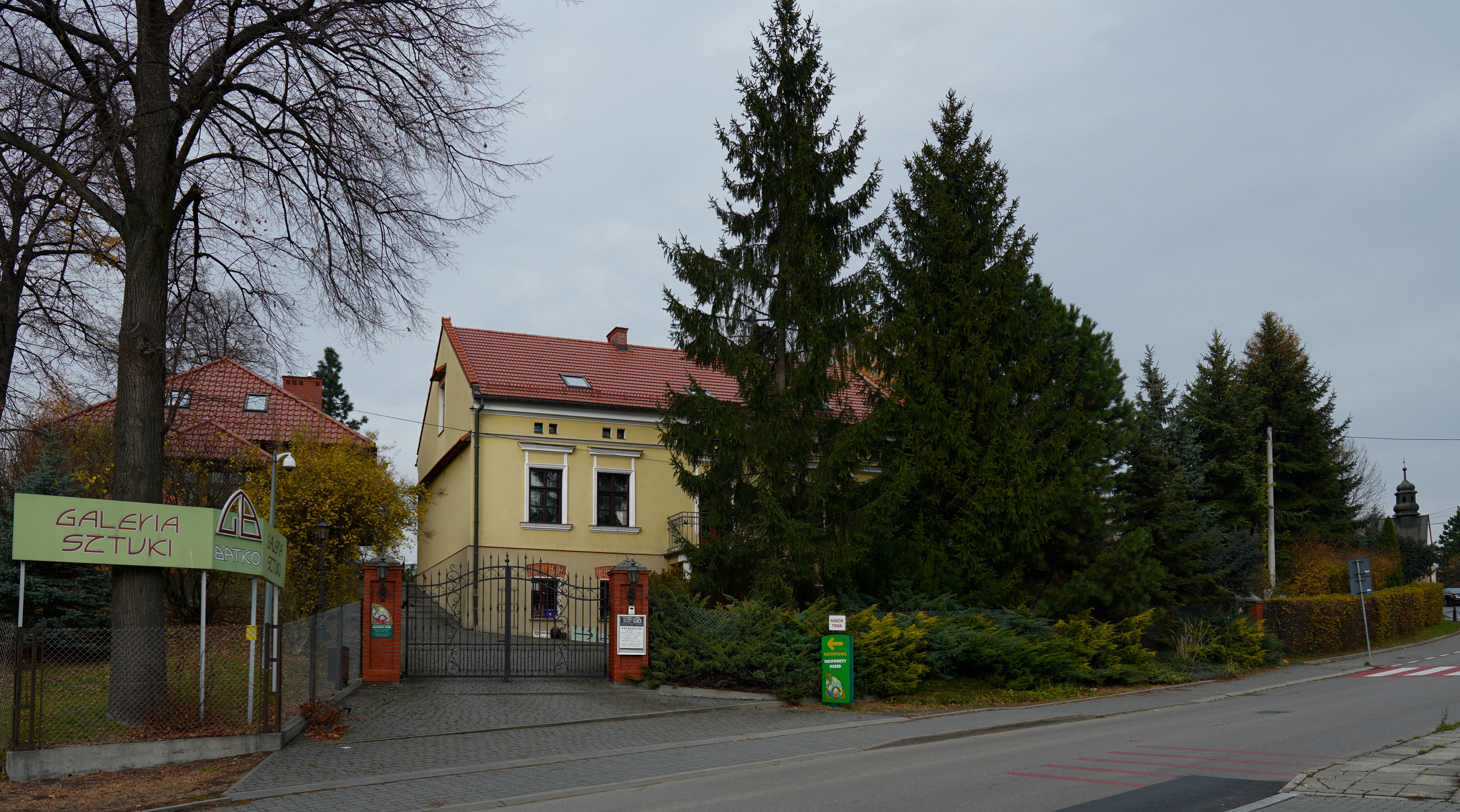

- Location within Poland
- Coordinates: 49°58′N 19°58′E
- Country: Poland
- Voivodeship: Lesser Poland
- County: Kraków
- Gmina: Świątniki Górne
- Population: 1,400

Ochojno [ɔˈxɔi̯nɔ] is a village in the administrative district of Gmina Świątniki Górne, within Kraków County, Lesser Poland Voivodeship, in southern Poland.
