= Szczodrkowice =

- Village
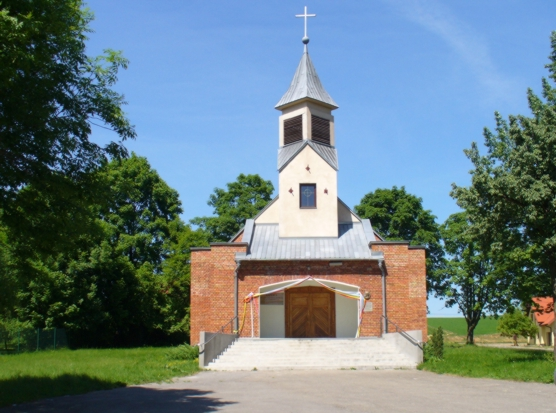
- Chapel

- Location within Poland
- Coordinates: 50°12′N 19°54′E
- Country: Poland
- Voivodeship: Lesser Poland
- County: Kraków
- Gmina: Skała
- Population: 557

Szczodrkowice [ʂt͡ʂɔdrkɔˈvit͡sɛ] is a village in the administrative district of Gmina Skała, within Kraków County, Lesser Poland Voivodeship, in southern Poland.
