= Wola Kalinowska =

- Village
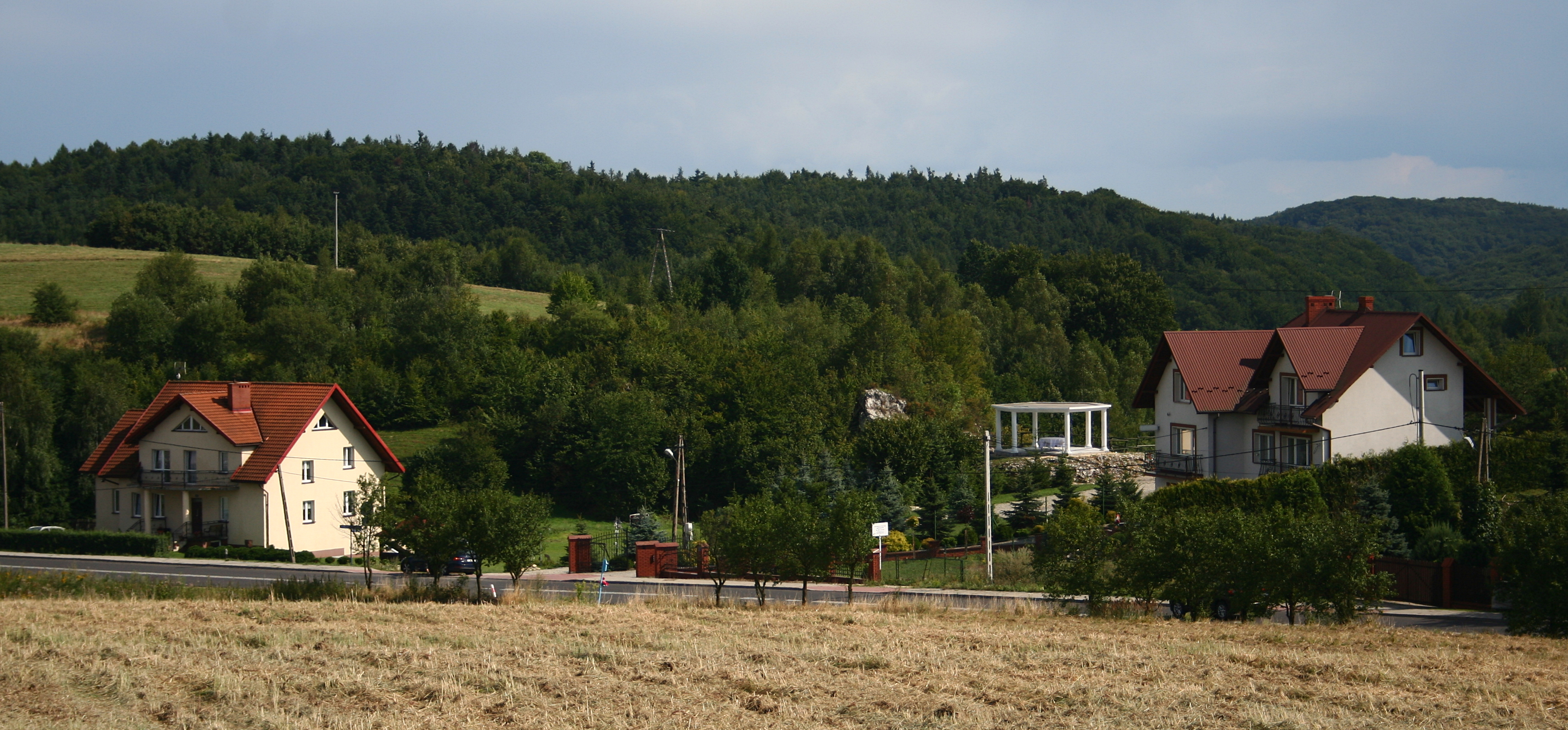

- Location within Poland
- Coordinates: 50°14′N 19°49′E
- Country: Poland
- Voivodeship: Lesser Poland
- County: Kraków
- Gmina: Sułoszowa

Wola Kalinowska [ˈvɔla kaliˈnɔfska] is a village in the administrative district of Gmina Sułoszowa, within Kraków County, Lesser Poland Voivodeship, in southern Poland.
