= Brończyce, Lesser Poland Voivodeship =

Brończyce
- Village
- Location within Poland
- Coordinates: 50°13′56″N 20°7′32″E
- Country: Poland
- Voivodeship: Lesser Poland
- County: Kraków
- Gmina: Słomniki

Brończyce [brɔɲˈt͡ʂɨt͡sɛ] is a village in the administrative district of Gmina Słomniki, within Kraków County, Lesser Poland Voivodeship, in southern Poland.
