= Koźlica =

- Village
- Location within Poland
- Coordinates: 50°04′58″N 20°14′44″E
- Country: Poland
- Voivodeship: Lesser Poland
- County: Kraków
- Gmina: Igołomia-Wawrzeńczyce

Koźlica [kɔˈʑlit͡sa] is a village in the administrative district of Gmina Igołomia-Wawrzeńczyce, within Kraków County, Lesser Poland Voivodeship, in southern Poland.
