= Nowa Wieś, Kraków County =

Nowa Wieś
- Village
- Location within Poland
- Coordinates: 50°14′6″N 19°53′15″E
- Country: Poland
- Voivodeship: Lesser Poland
- County: Kraków
- Gmina: Skała

Nowa Wieś [ˈnɔva ˈvjɛɕ] is a village in the administrative district of Gmina Skała, within Kraków County, Lesser Poland Voivodeship, in southern Poland.
