= Orłów, Lesser Poland Voivodeship =

Orłów
- Village
- Location within Poland
- Coordinates: 50°17′17″N 20°2′22″E
- Country: Poland
- Voivodeship: Lesser Poland
- County: Kraków
- Gmina: Słomniki
- Population: 162

Orłów [ˈɔrwuf] is a village in the administrative district of Gmina Słomniki, within Kraków County, Lesser Poland Voivodeship, in southern Poland.
