= Przybysławice, Gmina Skała =

Przybysławice
- Village
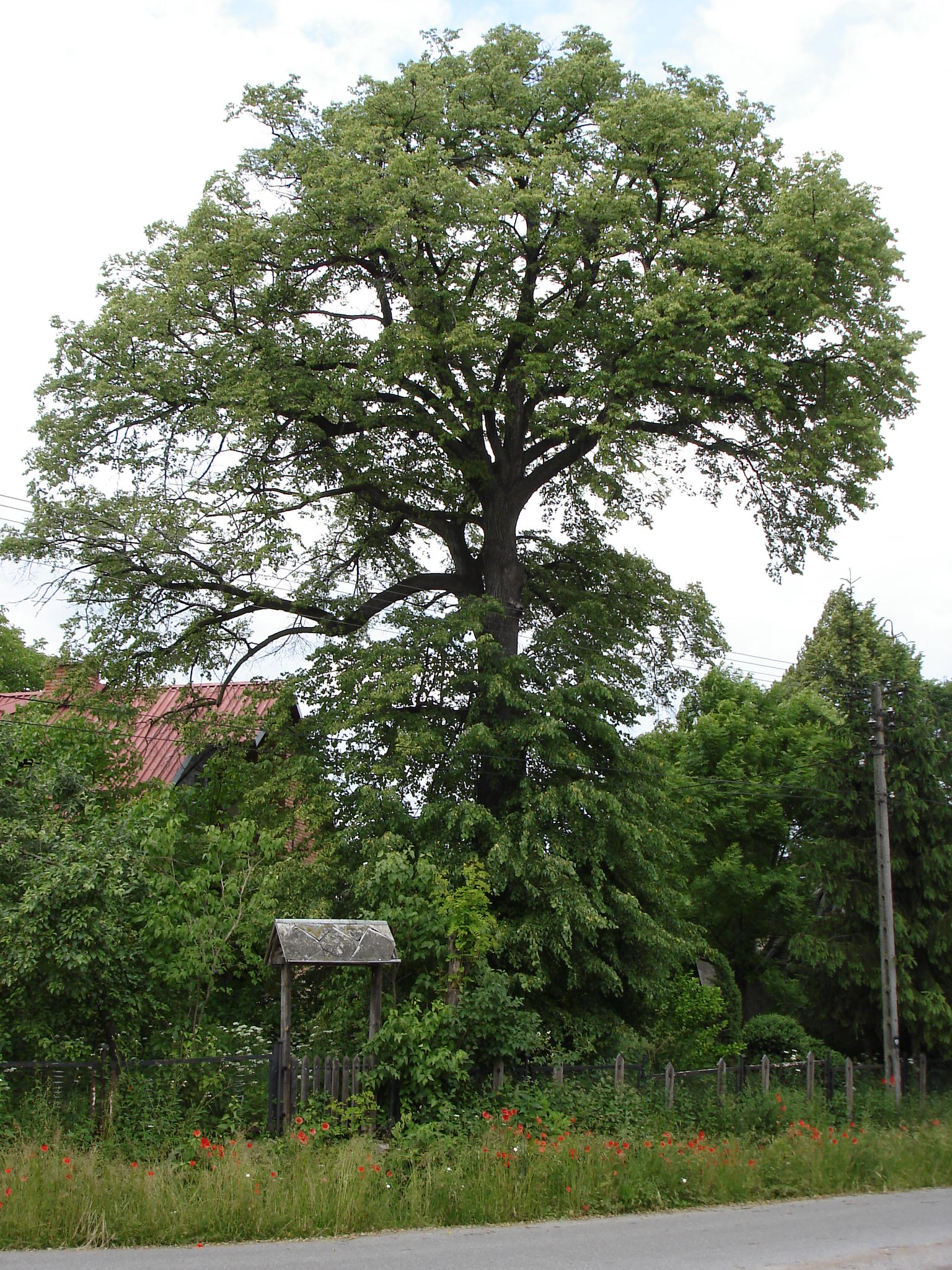

- Location within Poland
- Coordinates: 50°13′34″N 19°54′57″E
- Country: Poland
- Voivodeship: Lesser Poland
- County: Kraków
- Gmina: Skała

Przybysławice [pʂɨbɨswaˈvit͡sɛ] is a village in the administrative district of Gmina Skała, within Kraków County, Lesser Poland Voivodeship, in southern Poland.
