= Kępa, Kraków County =

Kępa
- Village
- Location within Poland
- Coordinates: 50°13′25″N 20°7′38″E
- Country: Poland
- Voivodeship: Lesser Poland
- County: Kraków
- Gmina: Słomniki
- Population: 185

Kępa [ˈkɛmpa] is a village in the administrative district of Gmina Słomniki, within Kraków County, Lesser Poland Voivodeship, in southern Poland.
