= Ratajów =

- Village
- Location within Poland
- Coordinates: 50°13′27″N 20°4′4″E
- Country: Poland
- Voivodeship: Lesser Poland
- County: Kraków
- Gmina: Słomniki
- Population: 605

Ratajów [raˈtajuf] is a village in the administrative district of Gmina Słomniki, within Kraków County, Lesser Poland Voivodeship, in southern Poland.
