= Wrząsowice =

- Village
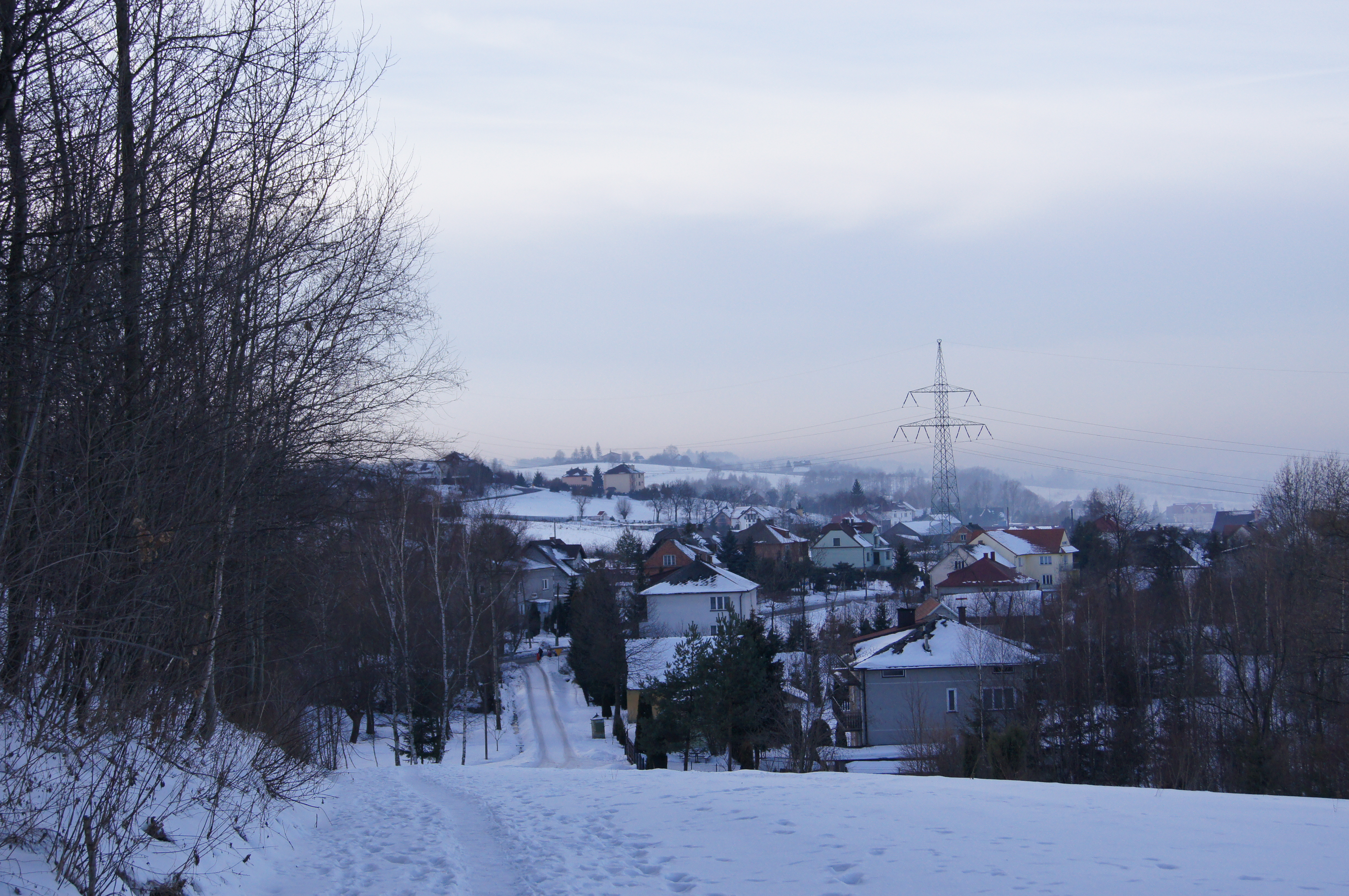
- Wrząsowice in winter

- Location within Poland
- Coordinates: 49°57′N 19°58′E
- Country: Poland
- Voivodeship: Lesser Poland
- County: Kraków
- Gmina: Świątniki Górne

Population
  - Total: 1,986

Wrząsowice [vʐɔ̃sɔˈvit͡sɛ] is a village in the administrative district of Gmina Świątniki Górne, within Kraków County, Lesser Poland Voivodeship, in southern Poland.
