= Olszowice =

- Village
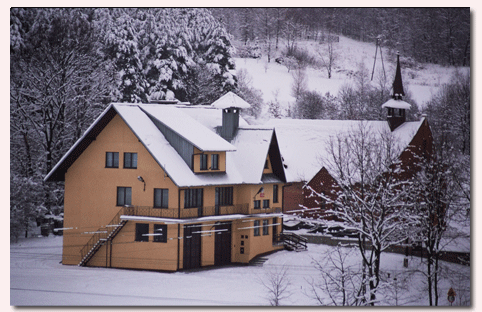
- Fire station

- Location within Poland
- Coordinates: 49°55′28″N 19°56′28″E
- Country: Poland
- Voivodeship: Lesser Poland
- County: Kraków
- Gmina: Świątniki Górne

Olszowice [ɔlʂɔˈvit͡sɛ] is a village in the administrative district of Gmina Świątniki Górne, within Kraków County, Lesser Poland Voivodeship, in southern Poland.
