= Zofipole, Lesser Poland Voivodeship =

Zofipole
- Village
- Location within Poland
- Coordinates: 50°5′9″N 20°13′45″E
- Country: Poland
- Voivodeship: Lesser Poland
- County: Kraków
- Gmina: Igołomia-Wawrzeńczyce
- Population: 460

Zofipole [zɔfiˈpɔlɛ] is a village in the administrative district of Gmina Igołomia-Wawrzeńczyce, within Kraków County, Lesser Poland Voivodeship, in southern Poland.
