= Zaborze, Kraków County =

Zaborze
- Village
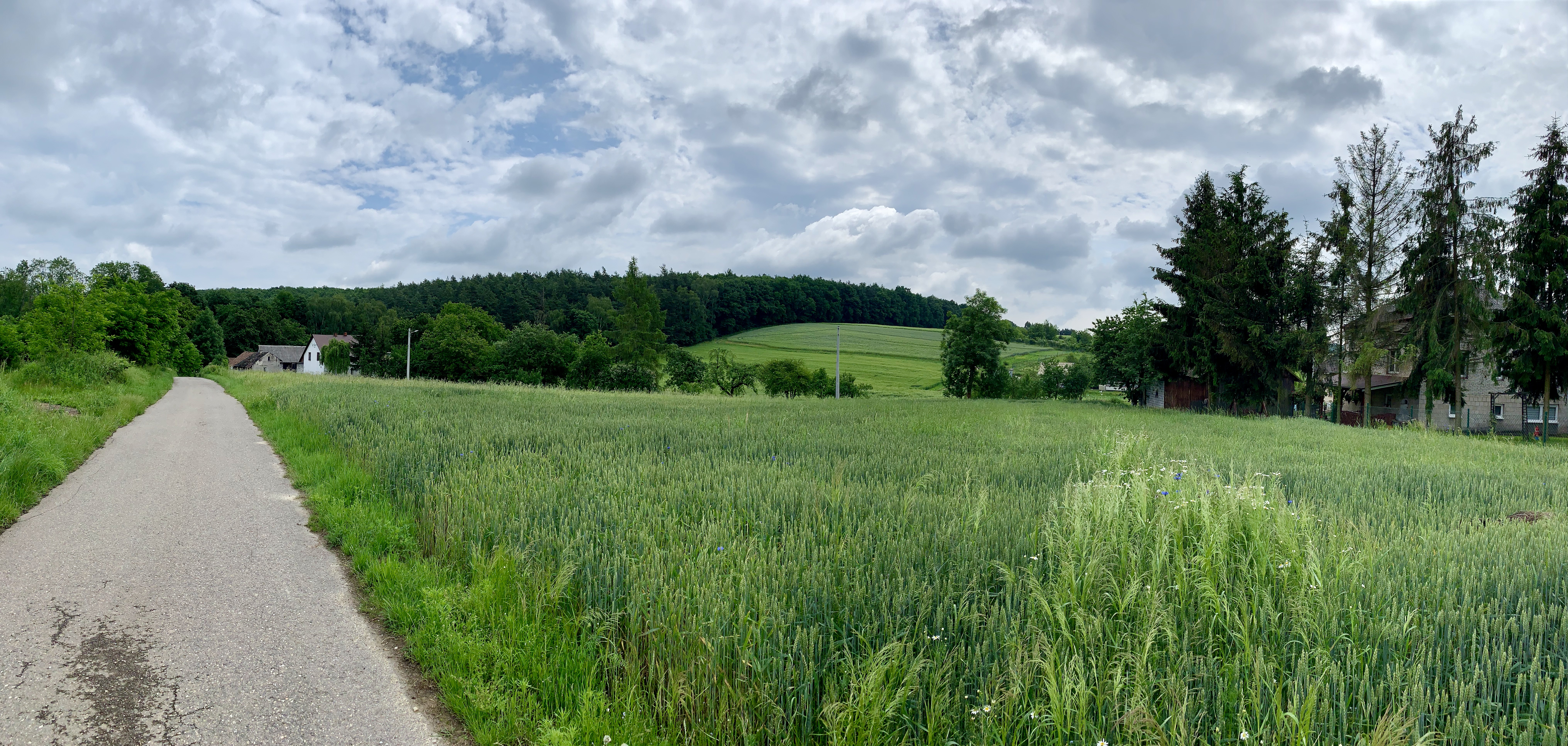

- Location within Poland
- Coordinates: 50°12′40″N 20°2′41″E
- Country: Poland
- Voivodeship: Lesser Poland
- County: Kraków
- Gmina: Słomniki
- Population: 344

Zaborze [zaˈbɔʐɛ] is a village in the administrative district of Gmina Słomniki, within Kraków County, Lesser Poland Voivodeship, in southern Poland.
