= Czechy, Lesser Poland Voivodeship =

Czechy
- Village
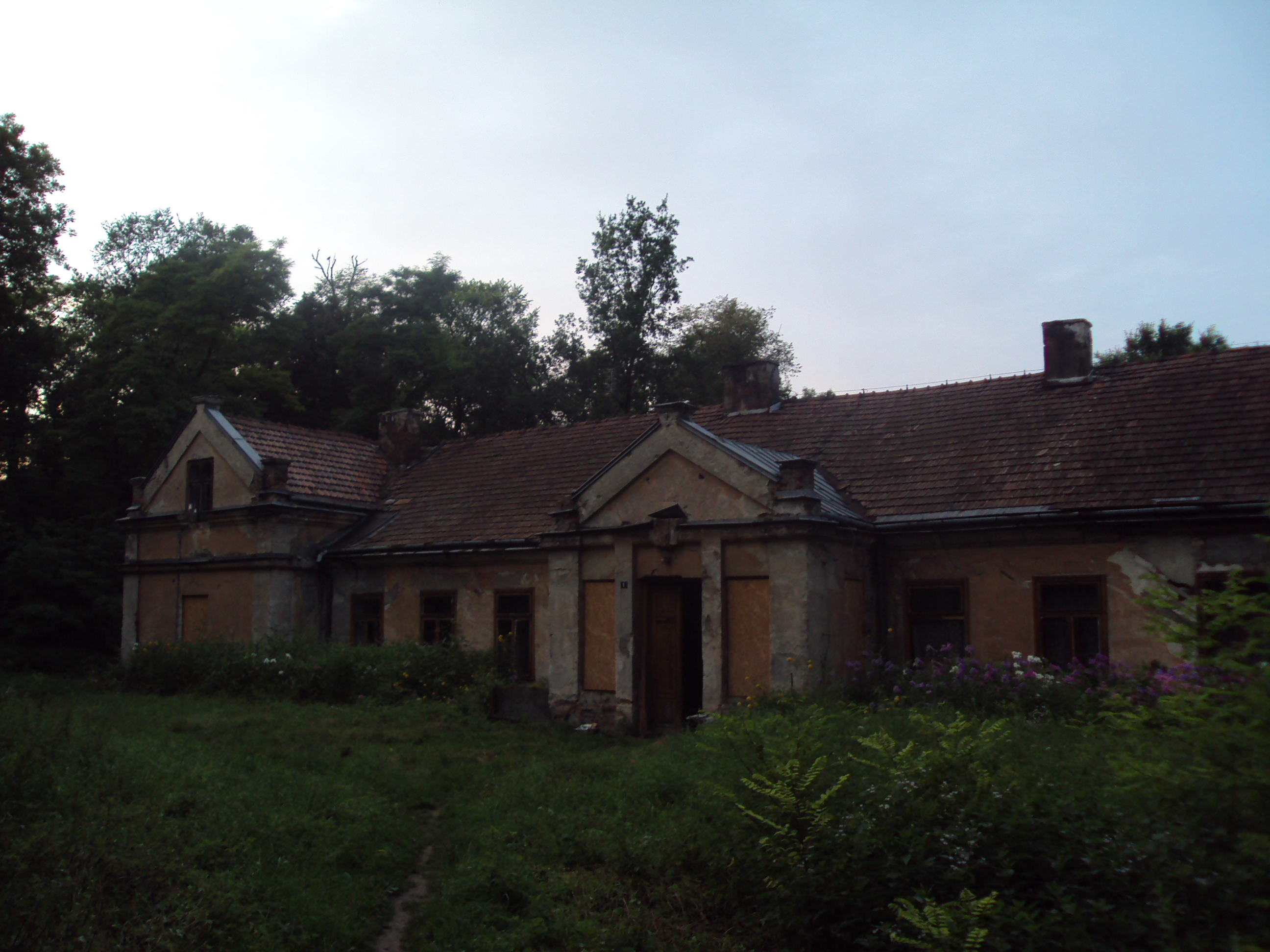
- Manor

- Location within Poland
- Coordinates: 50°13′25″N 20°9′43″E
- Country: Poland
- Voivodeship: Lesser Poland
- County: Kraków
- Gmina: Słomniki
- Population: 340

Czechy [ˈt͡ʂɛxɨ] is a village in the administrative district of Gmina Słomniki, within Kraków County, Lesser Poland Voivodeship, in southern Poland.
