= Odwiśle =

- Village
- Location within Poland
- Coordinates: 50°4′57.4″N 20°15′36.9″E
- Country: Poland
- Voivodeship: Lesser Poland
- County: Kraków
- Gmina: Igołomia-Wawrzeńczyce
- Population (approx.): 640

Odwiśle [ɔdˈviɕlɛ] is a village in the administrative district of Gmina Igołomia-Wawrzeńczyce, within Kraków County, Lesser Poland Voivodeship, in southern Poland.

The village has an approximate population of 640.
