= Żydów, Lesser Poland Voivodeship =

Żydów
- Village
- Location within Poland
- Coordinates: 50°7′N 20°16′E
- Country: Poland
- Voivodeship: Lesser Poland
- County: Kraków
- Gmina: Igołomia-Wawrzeńczyce
- Population: 198

Żydów [ˈʐɨduf] is a village in the administrative district of Gmina Igołomia-Wawrzeńczyce, within Kraków County, Lesser Poland Voivodeship, in southern Poland.
