= Prandocin, Lesser Poland Voivodeship =

Village in Poland

Prandocin
- Village
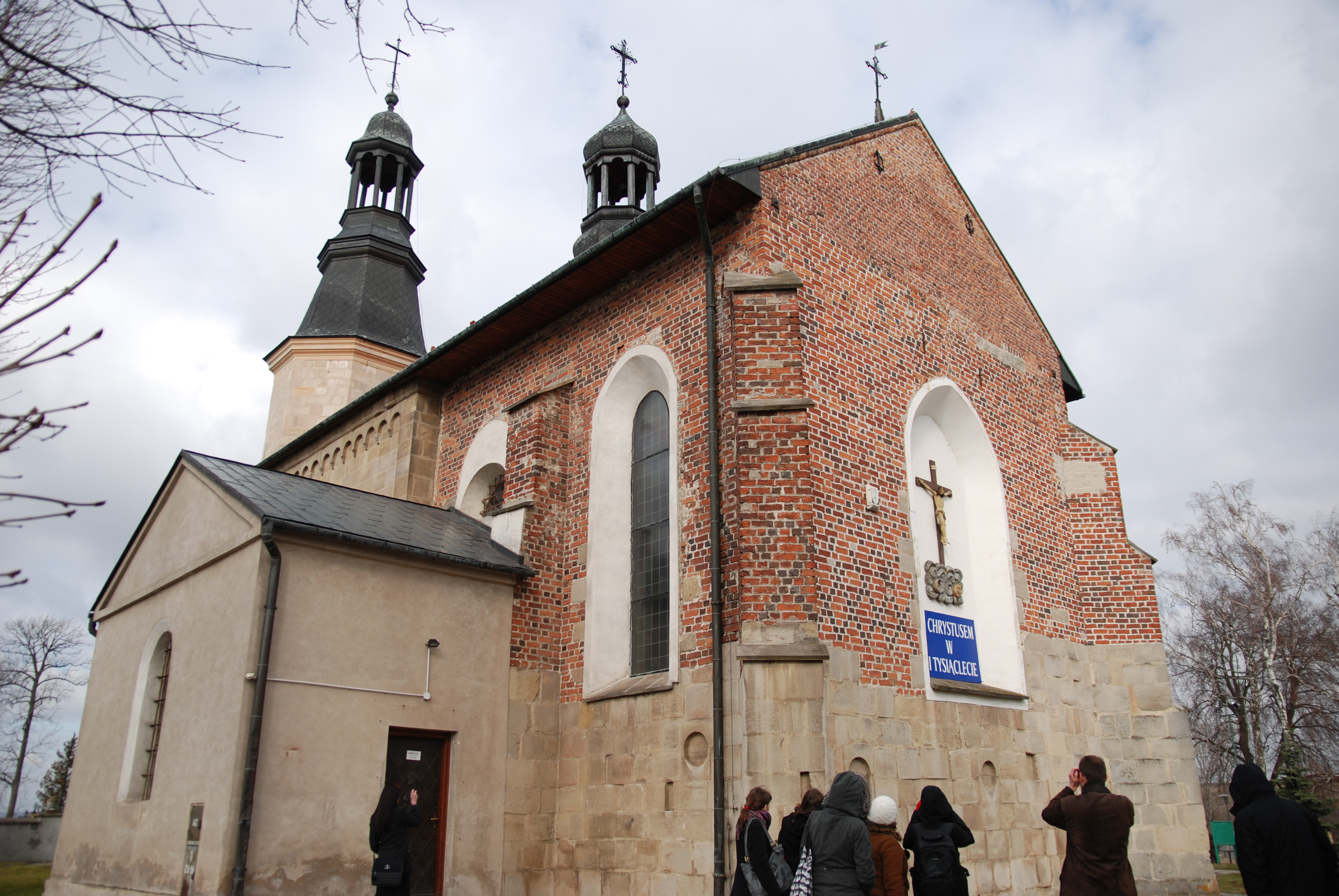
- Saint John the Baptist Church

- Location within Poland
- Coordinates: 50°15′55″N 20°6′1″E
- Country: Poland
- Voivodeship: Lesser Poland
- County: Kraków
- Gmina: Słomniki
- Population: 767

Prandocin [pranˈdɔt͡ɕin] is a village in the administrative district of Gmina Słomniki, in Kraków County, Lesser Poland Voivodeship, Poland.
