= Pobiednik Wielki =

- Village
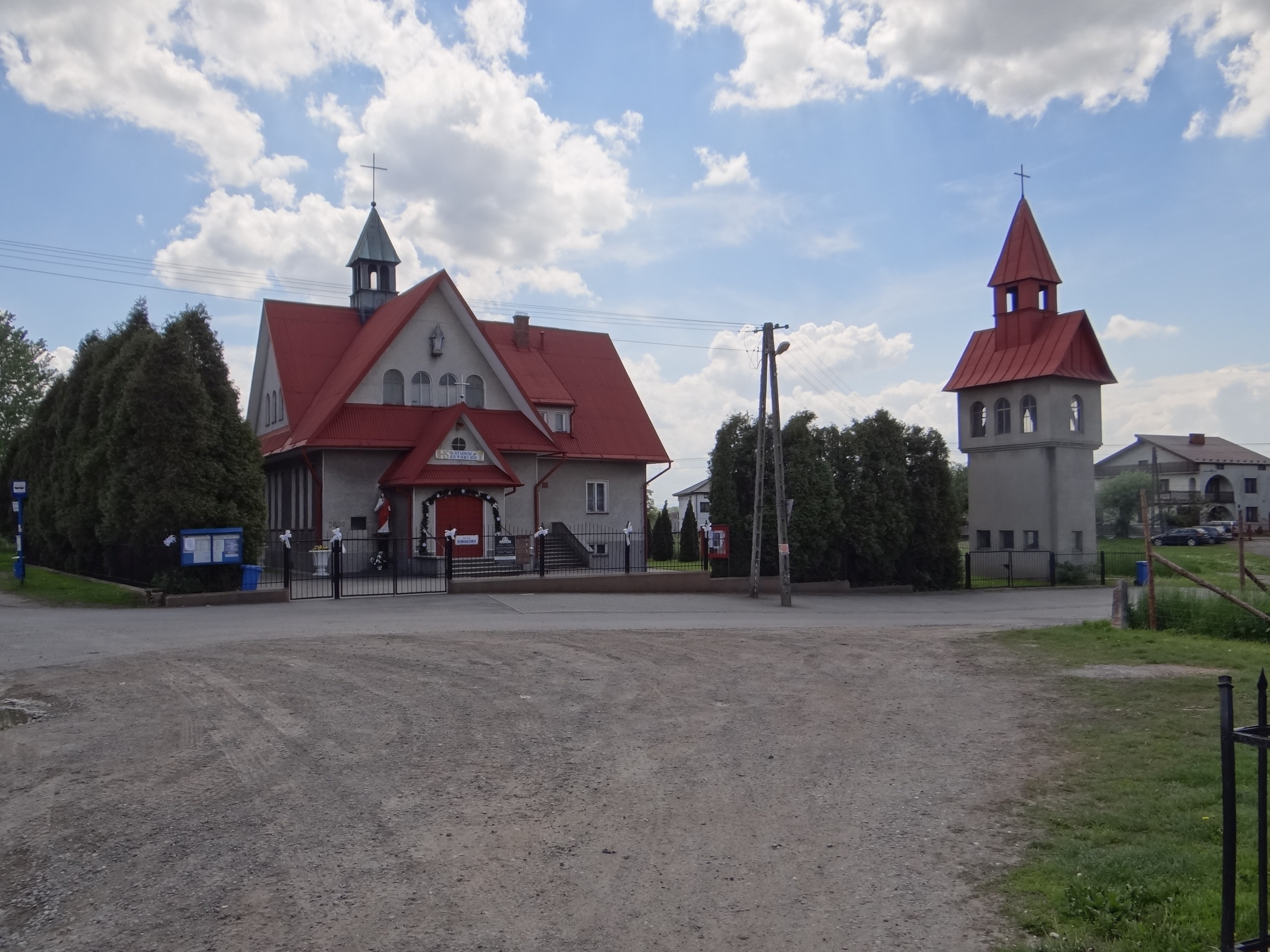

- Location within Poland
- Coordinates: 50°5′N 20°12′E
- Country: Poland
- Voivodeship: Lesser Poland
- County: Kraków
- Gmina: Igołomia-Wawrzeńczyce
- Mayor: Dominik Sroczyński

Pobiednik Wielki (Polish pronunciation: [pɔˈbjɛdɲik ˈfjɛlkʲi]) is a village in the administrative district of Gmina Igołomia-Wawrzeńczyce, within Kraków County, Lesser Poland Voivodeship, in southern Poland.
