= Cianowice =

Village in Poland

- Village
- Village center

- Location within Poland
- Coordinates: 50°11′59″N 19°52′32″E
- Country: Poland
- Voivodeship: Lesser Poland
- County: Kraków
- Gmina: Skała
- Population: 1,107

Cianowice [t͡ɕanɔˈvit͡sɛ] is a village in the administrative unit of Gmina Skała, within Kraków County, Lesser Poland Voivodeship, in southern Poland.

There is a manor house in the village, belonging to Dobiecki family, which was returned to the original owner's son, Count Eustache Dobiecki, in August 2003. The manor house was designed by Teodor Talowski in 1890.

== The Dobiecki manor house ==
View from the east

View from the south
