= Pobiednik Mały =

- Village
- Location within Poland
- Coordinates: 50°04′16″N 20°12′31″E
- Country: Poland
- Voivodeship: Lesser Poland
- County: Kraków
- Gmina: Igołomia-Wawrzeńczyce
- Mayor: Dominik Sroczyński

Pobiednik Mały (Polish pronunciation: [pɔˈbjɛdɲik ˈmawɨ]) is a village in the administrative district of Gmina Igołomia-Wawrzeńczyce, within Kraków County, Lesser Poland Voivodeship, in southern Poland.
