= Rzeszotary, Lesser Poland Voivodeship =

Rzeszotary
- Village
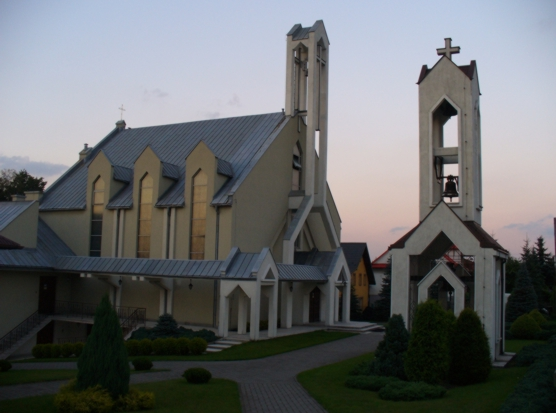
- Church

- Location within Poland
- Coordinates: 49°56′40″N 19°58′39″E
- Country: Poland
- Voivodeship: Lesser Poland
- County: Kraków
- Gmina: Świątniki Górne
- Population (approx.): 2,500

Rzeszotary [ʐɛʂɔˈtarɨ] is a village in the administrative district of Gmina Świątniki Górne, within Kraków County, Lesser Poland Voivodeship, in southern Poland.

The village has an approximate population of 2,500.
