= Szczepanowice, Kraków County =

Szczepanowice
- Village
- Location within Poland
- Coordinates: 50°11′45″N 20°6′37″E
- Country: Poland
- Voivodeship: Lesser Poland
- County: Kraków
- Gmina: Słomniki
- Population: 200

Szczepanowice [ʂt͡ʂɛpanɔˈvit͡sɛ] is a village in the administrative district of Gmina Słomniki, within Kraków County, Lesser Poland Voivodeship, in southern Poland.

== See also ==
- The Lesser Polish Way
