= Wawrzeńczyce, Lesser Poland Voivodeship =

Wawrzeńczyce
- Village
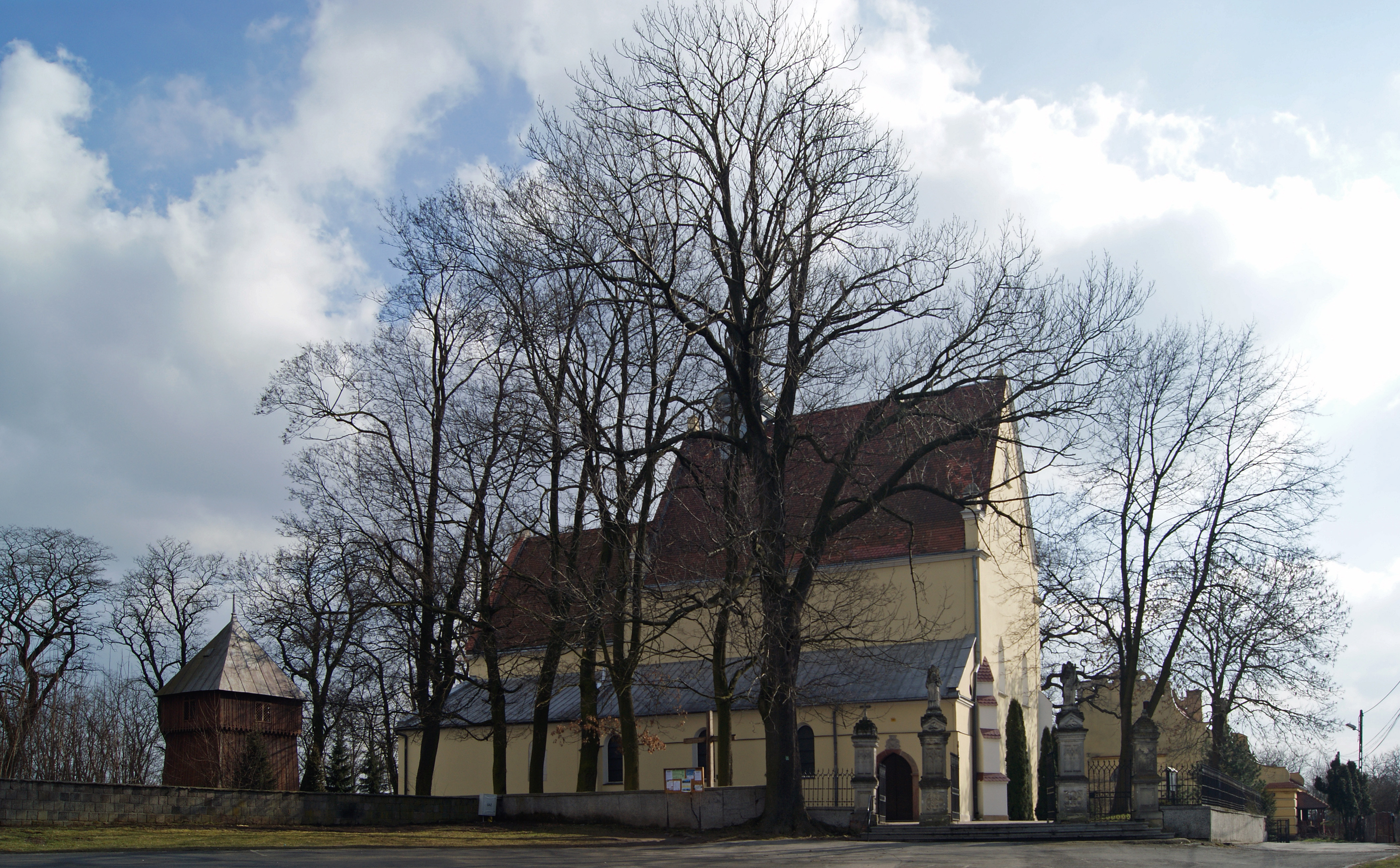
- Church of Saints Sigismund and Mary Magdalene

- Location within Poland
- Coordinates: 50°6′46″N 20°19′31″E
- Country: Poland
- Voivodeship: Lesser Poland
- County: Kraków
- Gmina: Igołomia-Wawrzeńczyce

Wawrzeńczyce [vavʐɛɲˈt͡ʂɨt͡sɛ] is a village in Kraków County, Lesser Poland Voivodeship, in southern Poland. It is the seat of the gmina (administrative district) called Gmina Igołomia-Wawrzeńczyce.

== Location ==
The village lies east of Kraków at the left side of Wisła, it is located on a high plain towering over a point bar of the river. There is the mouth of the Ropotek (Kiklowiec) stream.

== History ==
In the Middle Ages the village was a property of the Cracow's bishops. In a document dated dating from 1245 AD it is stated under name Laurinceviz, whereas in 1281 AD was called Wawrzynczicze. There was a marketplace initiated in vicinity of a ferring place through the Wisła river where people from the Niepołomice Forest, lived on the right bank of the river exchanged goods for agricultural commodities from the Proszowice Land.

Initially the village was called Długa Wieś (Long Village). The marketplace had been established in a region called Wawrzeńczyce and after the name covered whole the current village.
