= Niedźwiedź, Kraków County =

Niedźwiedź
- Village
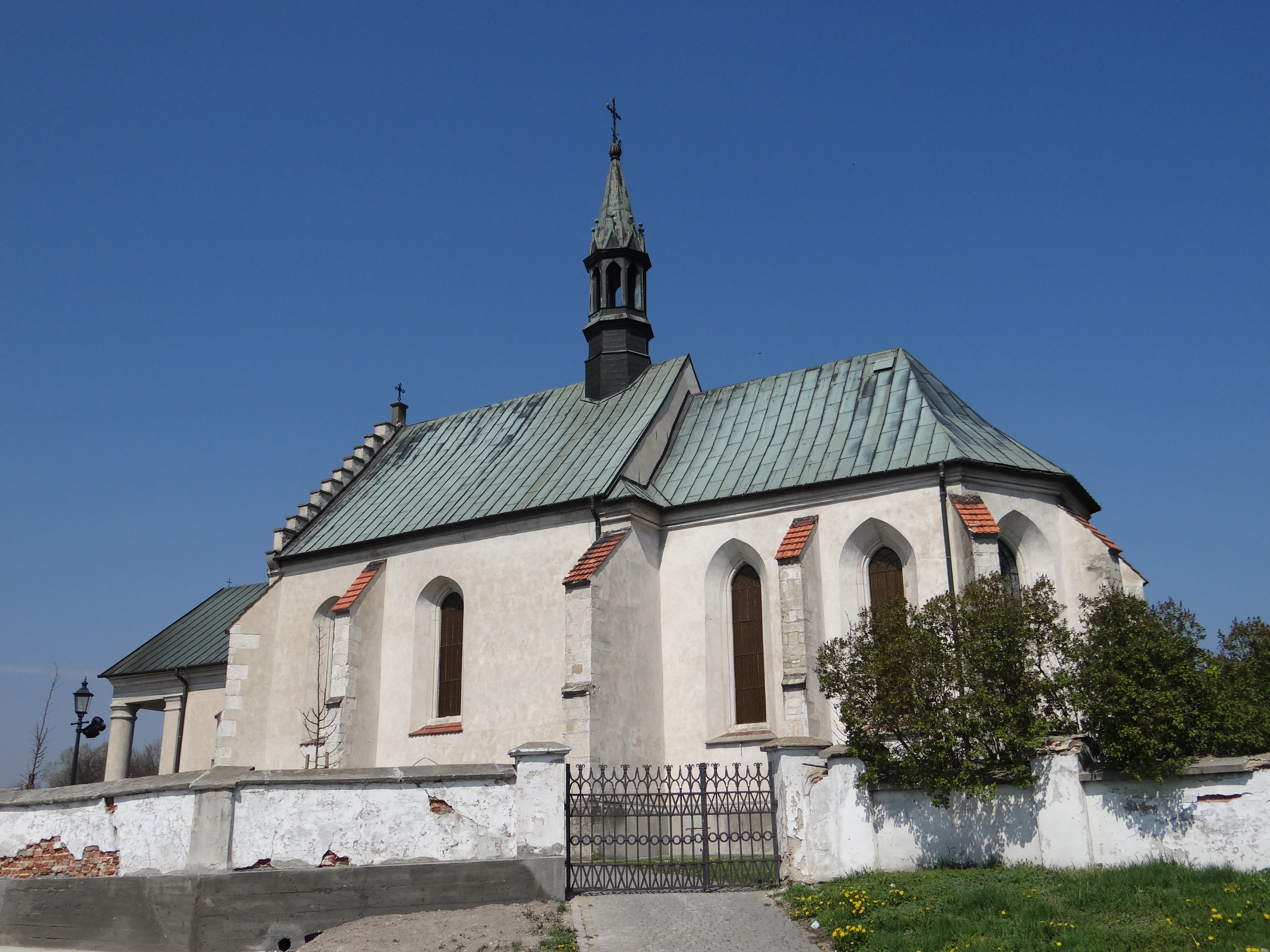
- Adalbert of Prague church

- Location within Poland
- Coordinates: 50°13′28″N 20°5′35″E
- Country: Poland
- Voivodeship: Lesser Poland
- County: Kraków
- Gmina: Słomniki
- Population: 662

Niedźwiedź [ˈɲɛd͡ʑvjɛt͡ɕ] is a village in the administrative district of Gmina Słomniki, within Kraków County, Lesser Poland Voivodeship, in southern Poland.
