= Gmina Skała =

Gmina Skała Skała Commune
- Gmina
- Flag Coat of arms
- Interactive map of Gmina Skała
- Coordinates (Skała): 50°14′N 19°52′E
- Country: Poland
- Voivodeship: Lesser Poland
- County: Kraków County
- Seat: Skała

Area
  - Total: 74.3 km^{2} (28.7 sq mi)

Population (2006)
  - Total: 9,635
  - Density: 130/km^{2} (336/sq mi)
  - Urban: 3,693
  - Rural: 5,942
- Website: http://www.skala.pl

Gmina Skała is an urban-rural gmina (administrative district) in Kraków County, Lesser Poland Voivodeship, in southern Poland. Its seat is the town of Skała, which lies approximately 20 kilometres (12 mi) north of the regional capital Kraków.

The gmina covers an area of 74.3 square kilometres (28.7 sq mi), and as of 2006 its total population is 9,635 (out of which the population of Skała amounts to 3,693, and the population of the rural part of the gmina is 5,942).

The gmina contains part of the protected area called Dłubnia Landscape Park.

== Villages ==
Apart from the town of Skała, Gmina Skała contains the villages and settlements of Barbarka, Cianowice Duże, Cianowice Małe, Gołyszyn, Maszyce, Minoga, Niebyła, Nowa Wieś, Ojców, Poręba Laskowska, Przybysławice, Rzeplin, Smardzowice, Sobiesęki, Stoki, Świńczów, Szczodrkowice and Zamłynie.

== Neighbouring gminas ==
Gmina Skała is bordered by the gminas of Gołcza, Iwanowice, Jerzmanowice-Przeginia, Sułoszowa, Trzyciąż, Wielka Wieś and Zielonki.
