= Polanowice, Lesser Poland Voivodeship =

Polanowice
- Village
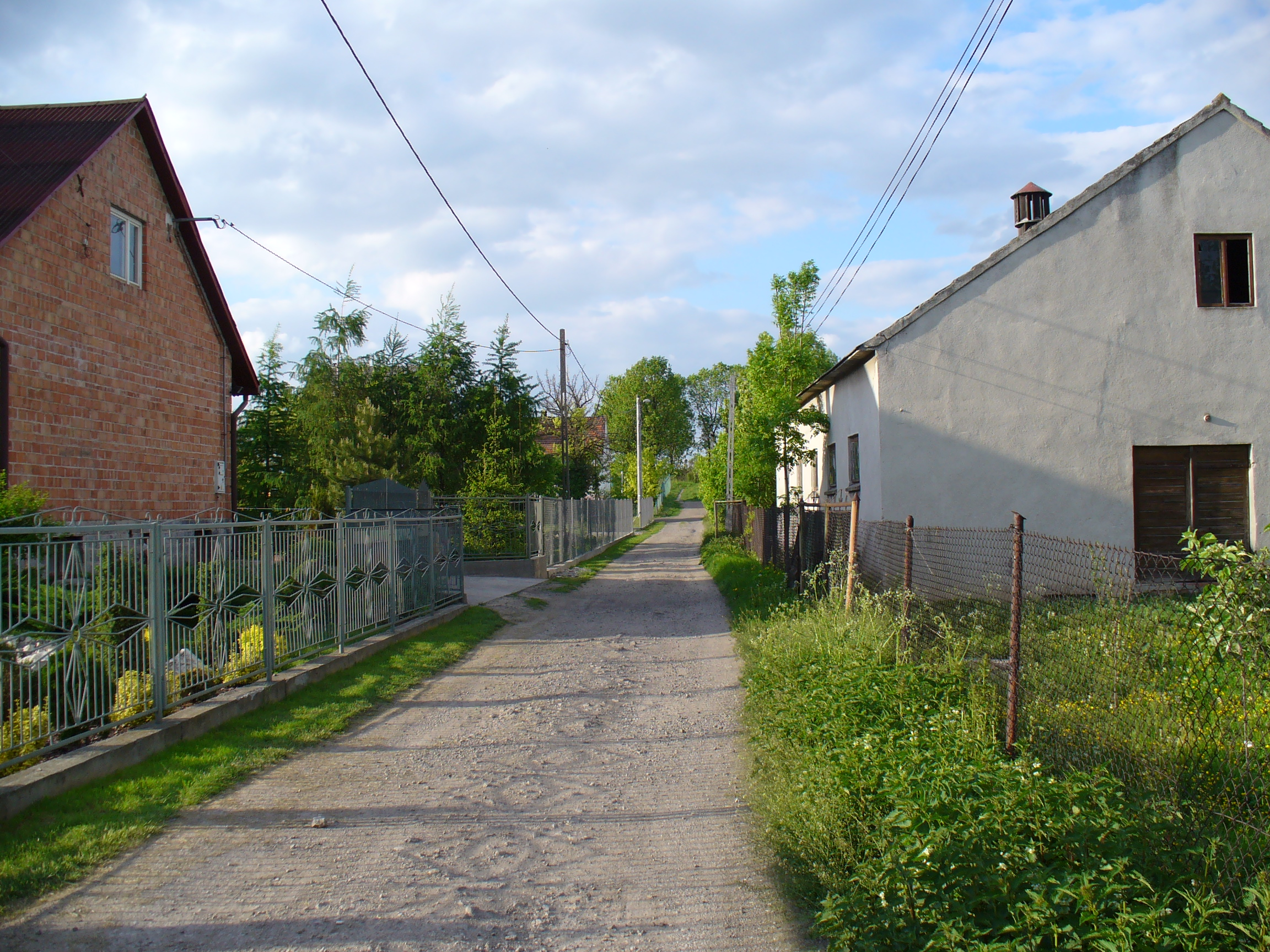
- Road through the village

- Location within Poland
- Coordinates: 50°11′55″N 20°4′35″E
- Country: Poland
- Voivodeship: Lesser Poland
- County: Kraków
- Gmina: Słomniki
- Population: 687

Polanowice [pɔlanɔˈvit͡sɛ] is a village in the administrative district of Gmina Słomniki, within Kraków County, Lesser Poland Voivodeship, in southern Poland.

== See also ==
- The Lesser Polish Way
