= Gmina Igołomia-Wawrzeńczyce =

Gmina Igołomia-Wawrzeńczyce Igołomia-Wawrzeńczyce Commune
- Gmina
- Flag Coat of arms
- Interactive map of Gmina Igołomia-Wawrzeńczyce
- Coordinates (Wawrzeńczyce): 50°6′46″N 20°19′31″E
- Country: Poland
- Voivodeship: Lesser Poland
- County: Kraków County
- Seat: Wawrzeńczyce

Area
  - Total: 62.59 km^{2} (24.17 sq mi)

Population (2006)
  - Total: 7,661
  - Density: 122.4/km^{2} (317.0/sq mi)
- Website: http://www.ugigolomia_wawrzenczyce.republika.pl/

Gmina Igołomia-Wawrzeńczyce is a rural gmina (administrative district) in Kraków County, Lesser Poland Voivodeship, in southern Poland. Its seat is the village of Wawrzeńczyce, which lies approximately 29 kilometres (18 mi) east of the regional capital Kraków.

The gmina covers an area of 62.59 square kilometres (24.2 sq mi), and as of 2006 its total population is 7,661.

== Villages ==
Gmina Igołomia-Wawrzeńczyce contains the villages and settlements of Dobranowice, Igołomia, Koźlica, Odwiśle, Pobiednik Mały, Pobiednik Wielki, Rudno Górne, Stręgoborzyce, Tropiszów, Wawrzeńczyce, Wygnanów, Złotniki, Zofipole and Żydów.

== Neighbouring gminas ==
Gmina Igołomia-Wawrzeńczyce is bordered by the city of Kraków and by the gminas of Drwinia, Kocmyrzów-Luborzyca, Koniusza, Niepołomice, Nowe Brzesko and Proszowice.
