= Gmina Świątniki Górne =

Gmina Świątniki Górne Świątniki Górne Commune
- Gmina
- Coat of arms
- Interactive map of Gmina Świątniki Górne
- Coordinates (Świątniki Górne): 49°56′N 19°57′E
- Country: Poland
- Voivodeship: Lesser Poland
- County: Kraków County
- Seat: Świątniki Górne

Area
  - Total: 20.17 km^{2} (7.79 sq mi)

Population (2006)
  - Total: 8,619
  - Density: 427.3/km^{2} (1,107/sq mi)
  - Urban: 2,101
  - Rural: 6,518
- Website: http://www.swiatniki-gorne.pl/

Gmina Świątniki Górne is an urban-rural gmina (administrative district) in Kraków County, Lesser Poland Voivodeship, in southern Poland. Its seat is the town of Świątniki Górne, which lies approximately 15 kilometres (9 mi) south of the regional capital Kraków.

The gmina covers an area of 20.17 square kilometres (7.8 sq mi), and as of 2006 its total population is 8,619 (out of which the population of Świątniki Górne amounts to 2,101, and the population of the rural part of the gmina is 6,518).

== Villages ==
Apart from the town of Świątniki Górne, Gmina Świątniki Górne contains the villages and settlements of Ochojno, Olszowice, Rzeszotary, Rzeszotary Górne, Wrząsowice and Zalesie.

== Neighbouring gminas ==
Gmina Świątniki Górne is bordered by the city of Kraków and by the gminas of Mogilany, Siepraw and Wieliczka.
