= Gmina Słomniki =

Gmina Słomniki Słomniki Commune
- Gmina
- Coat of arms
- Interactive map of Gmina Słomniki
- Coordinates (Słomniki): 50°15′N 20°6′E
- Country: Poland
- Voivodeship: Lesser Poland
- County: Kraków County
- Seat: Słomniki

Area
  - Total: 111.38 km^{2} (43.00 sq mi)

Population (2006)
  - Total: 13,589
  - Density: 122.01/km^{2} (315.99/sq mi)
  - Urban: 4,331
  - Rural: 9,258
- Website: http://www.slomniki.pl/

Gmina Słomniki is an urban-rural gmina (administrative district) in Kraków County, Lesser Poland Voivodeship, in southern Poland. Its seat is the town of Słomniki, which lies approximately 24 kilometres (15 mi) north-east of the regional capital Kraków.

The gmina covers an area of 111.38 square kilometres (43.0 sq mi), and as of 2006 its total population is 13,589 (out of which the population of Słomniki amounts to 4,331, and the population of the rural part of the gmina is 9,258).

== Villages ==
Apart from the town of Słomniki, Gmina Słomniki contains the villages and settlements of Brończyce, Czechy, Janikowice, Januszowice, Kacice, Kępa, Lipna Wola, Miłocice, Muniakowice, Niedźwiedź, Orłów, Polanowice, Prandocin, Prandocin-Iły, Prandocin-Wysiołek, Ratajów, Smroków, Szczepanowice, Trątnowice, Waganowice, Wesoła, Wężerów, Zaborze and Zagaje Smrokowskie.

== Neighbouring gminas ==
Gmina Słomniki is bordered by the gminas of Gołcza, Iwanowice, Kocmyrzów-Luborzyca, Koniusza, Miechów and Radziemice.
