= Gmina Sułoszowa =

Gmina Sułoszowa Sułoszowa Commune
- Gmina
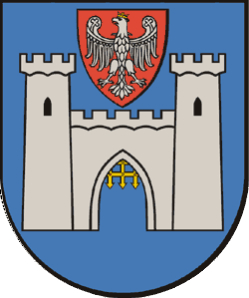
- Coat of arms
- Interactive map of Gmina Sułoszowa
- Coordinates (Sułoszowa): 50°16′N 19°42′E
- Country: Poland
- Voivodeship: Lesser Poland
- County: Kraków County
- Seat: Sułoszowa

Area
  - Total: 53.38 km^{2} (20.61 sq mi)

Population (2006)
  - Total: 5,880
  - Density: 110/km^{2} (285/sq mi)
- Website: http://www.suloszowa.pl

Gmina Sułoszowa is a rural gmina (administrative district) in Kraków County, Lesser Poland Voivodeship, in southern Poland. Its seat is the village of Sułoszowa, which lies approximately 29 kilometres (18 mi) north-west of the regional capital Kraków.

The gmina covers an area of 53.38 square kilometres (20.6 sq mi), and as of 2006 its total population is 5,880.

== Villages ==
The gmina contains the villages of Sułoszowa, Wielmoża and Wola Kalinowska.

== Neighbouring gminas ==
Gmina Sułoszowa is bordered by the gminas of Jerzmanowice-Przeginia, Olkusz, Skała and Trzyciąż.
