= Sułoszowa =

Linear village in Poland

- Village
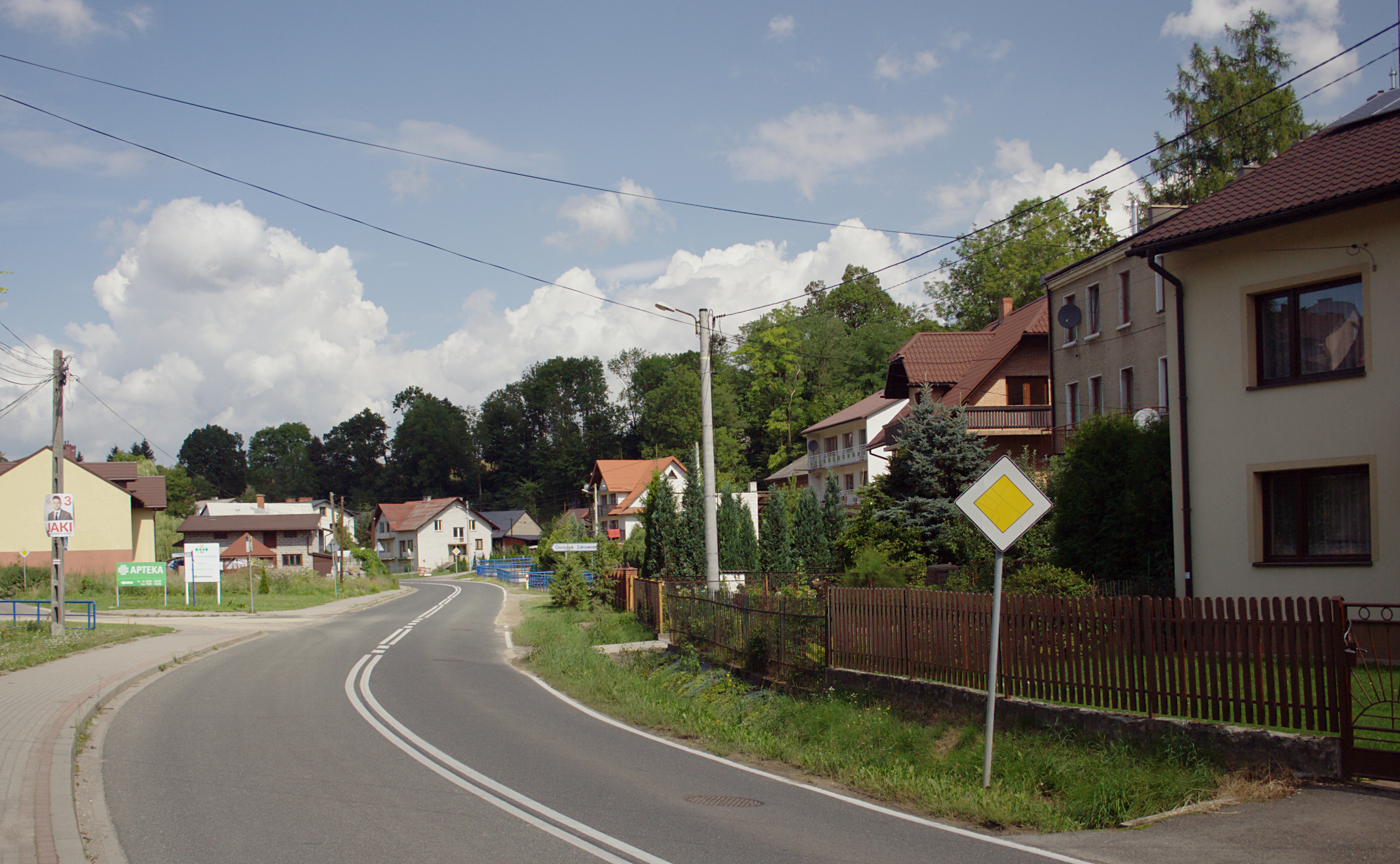
- Interactive map of Sułoszowa
- Location within Poland
- Coordinates: 50°16′10″N 19°43′30″E
- Country: Poland
- Voivodeship: Lesser Poland
- County: Kraków
- Gmina: Sułoszowa
- Population: 3,499
- Postal code: 32-045
- SIMC: 0337231

Sułoszowa [suwɔˈʂɔva] is a village in Kraków County, Lesser Poland Voivodeship, in southern Poland. It serves as the seat of an administrative district called Gmina Sułoszowa.

Sułoszowa is a linear settlement clustered around a single street, which is one of the longest in Poland, measuring around 9 kilometers, though there are also several short streets. As of 2021, the population of Suloszowa was 3,499.
