= Świątniki Górne =

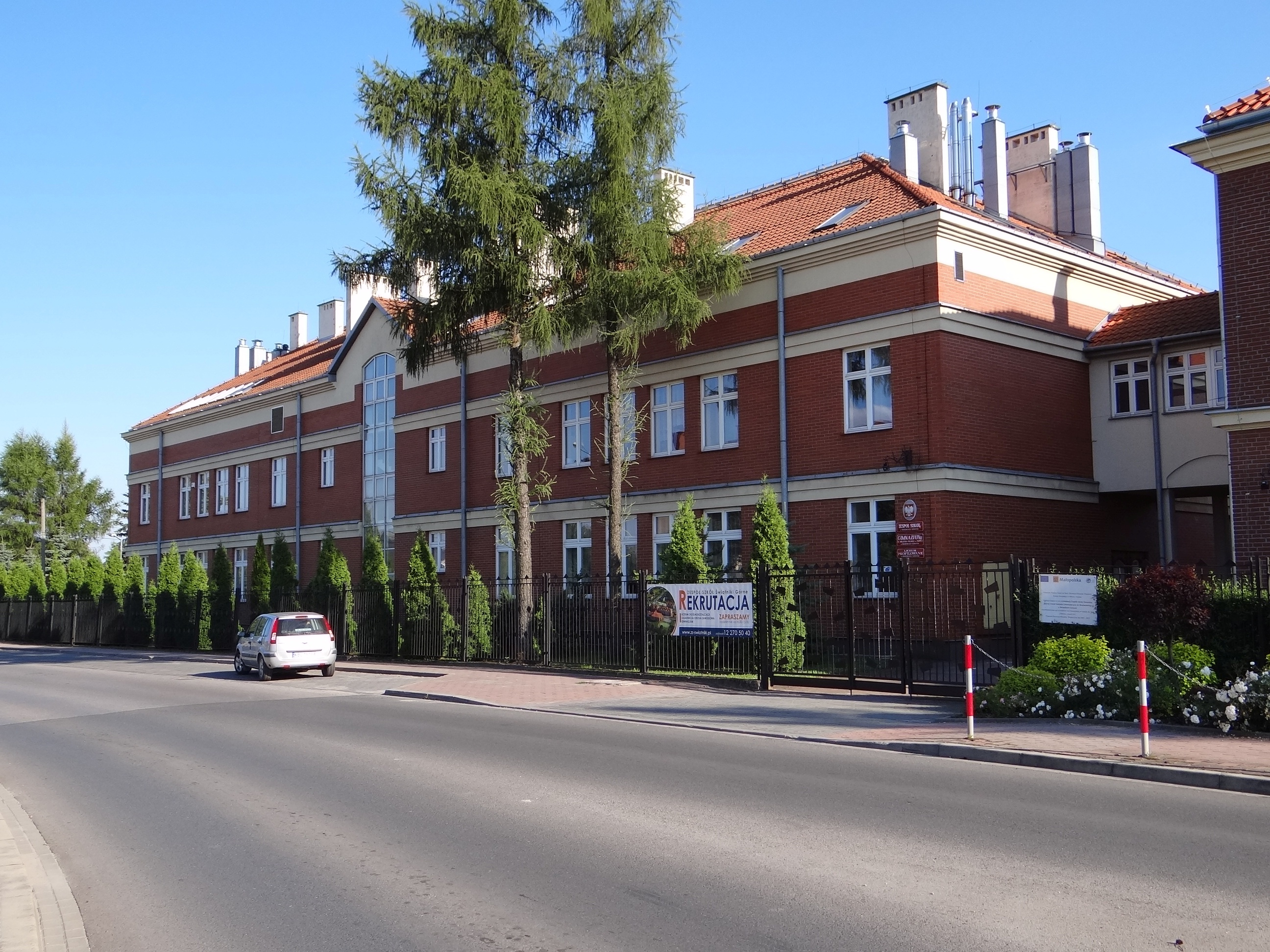
- Main street in the town

- Coat of arms

- Location within Poland
- Coordinates: 49°56′N 19°57′E
- Country: Poland
- Voivodeship: Lesser Poland
- County: Kraków
- Gmina: Świątniki Górne

Government
  - Mayor: Małgorzata Duży

Area
  - Total: 4.44 km^{2} (1.71 sq mi)

Population (2006)
  - Total: 2,101
  - Density: 473/km^{2} (1,230/sq mi)
- Time zone: UTC+1 (CET)
  - Summer (DST): UTC+2 (CEST)
- Postal code: 32-040
- Car plates: KRA
- Website: www.swiatniki-gorne.pl

Świątniki Górne (Polish pronunciation: [ɕfjɔntˈɲikʲi ˈɡurnɛ]) is a town in southern Poland, situated in the Lesser Poland Voivodeship (since 1999), previously in Kraków Voivodeship (1975–1998).
