= Rzeplin, Lesser Poland Voivodeship =

Rzeplin
- Village
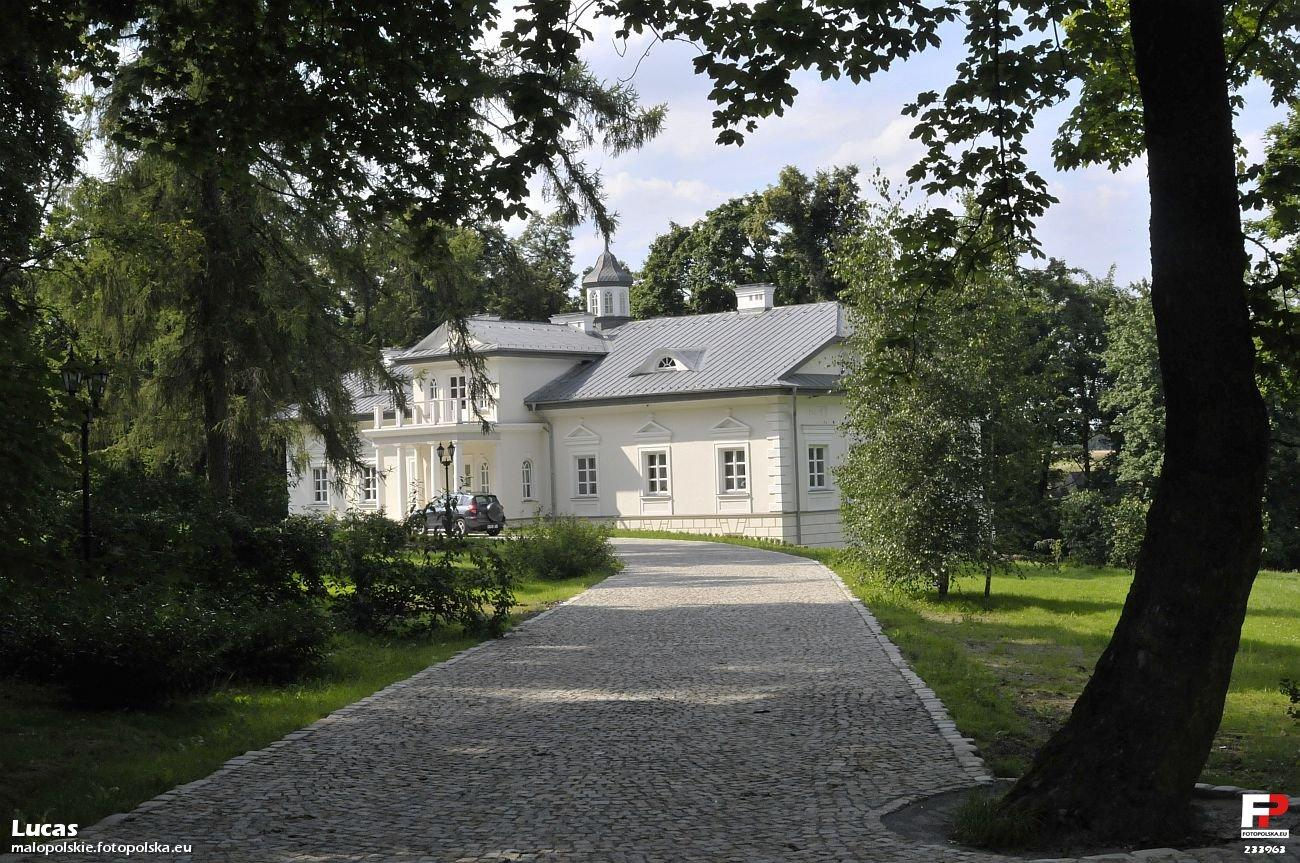
- Manor house

- Location within Poland
- Coordinates: 50°12′44″N 19°54′28″E
- Country: Poland
- Voivodeship: Lesser Poland
- County: Kraków
- Gmina: Skała

Rzeplin [ˈʐɛplin] is a village in the administrative district of Gmina Skała, within Kraków County, Lesser Poland Voivodeship, in southern Poland.
