= Kacice, Lesser Poland Voivodeship =

Kacice
- Village
- Location within Poland
- Coordinates: 50°14′45″N 20°1′55″E
- Country: Poland
- Voivodeship: Lesser Poland
- County: Kraków
- Gmina: Słomniki
- Population: 383

Kacice [kaˈt͡ɕit͡sɛ] is a village in the administrative district of Gmina Słomniki, within Kraków County, Lesser Poland Voivodeship, in southern Poland.
