= Miłocice, Lesser Poland Voivodeship =

Miłocice
- Village
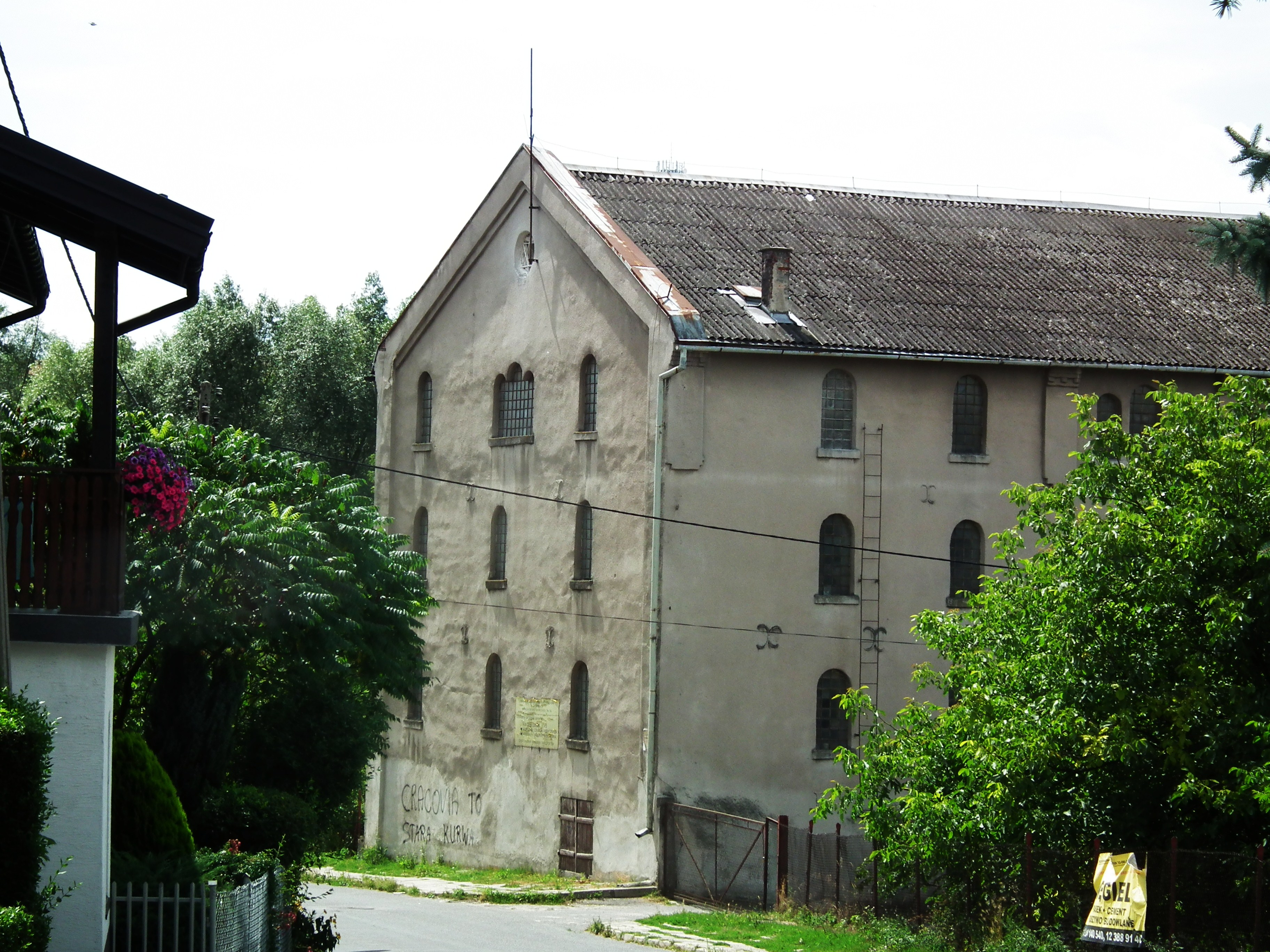
- Watermill

- Location within Poland
- Coordinates: 50°13′55″N 20°2′7″E
- Country: Poland
- Voivodeship: Lesser Poland
- County: Kraków
- Gmina: Słomniki
- Population: 837

Miłocice [miwɔˈt͡ɕit͡sɛ] is a village in the administrative district of Gmina Słomniki, within Kraków County, Lesser Poland Voivodeship, in southern Poland.
