= Słomniki =

Town in Lesser Poland Voivodeship, Poland

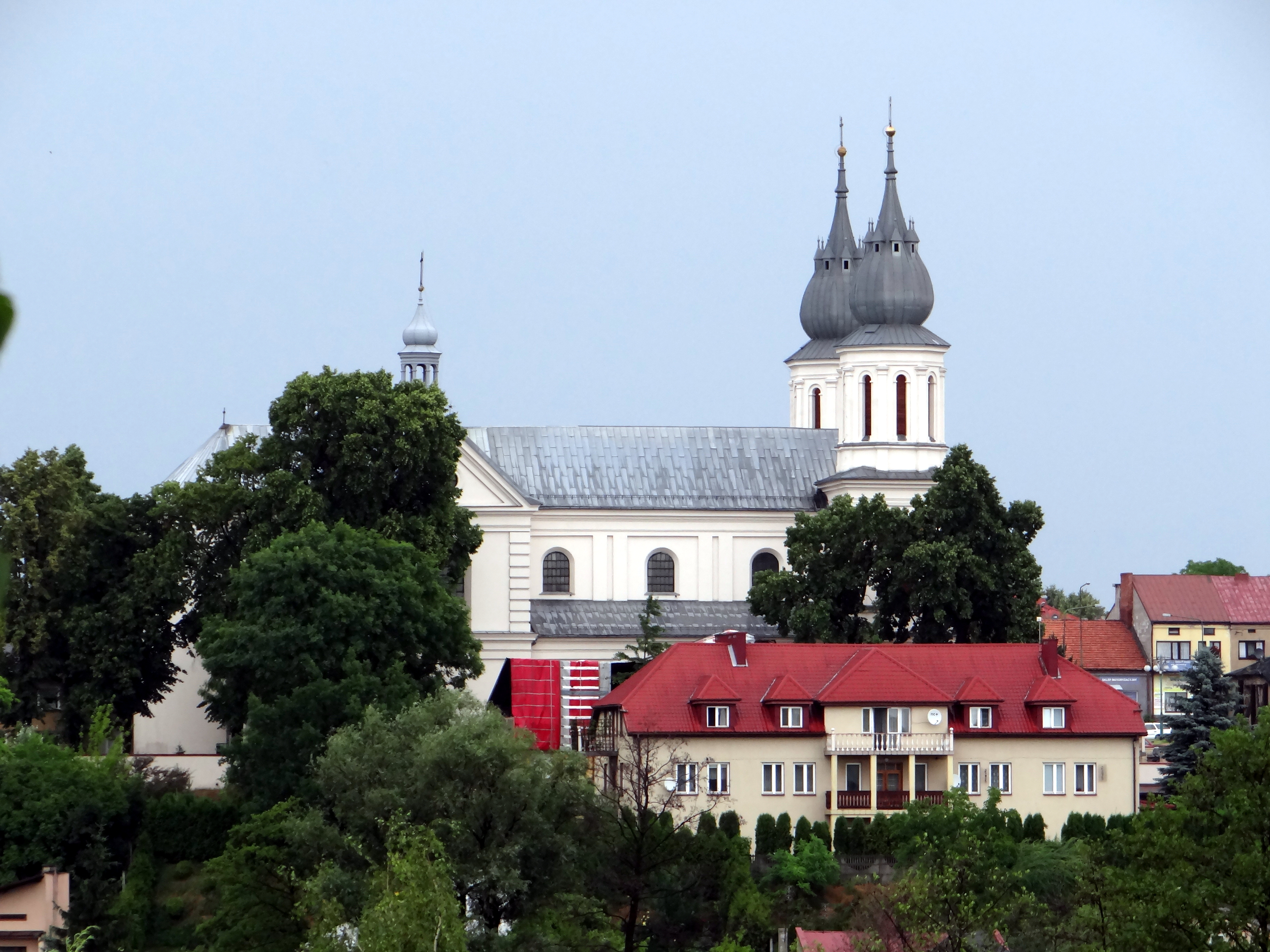
- Corpus Christi church

- Coat of arms

- Location within Poland
- Coordinates: 50°15′N 20°6′E
- Country: Poland
- Voivodeship: Lesser Poland
- County: Kraków
- Gmina: Słomniki
- Town rights: 1358

Government
  - Mayor: Paweł Knafel

Area
  - Total: 3.34 km^{2} (1.29 sq mi)

Population (2010)
  - Total: 4,365
  - Density: 1,310/km^{2} (3,380/sq mi)
- Time zone: UTC+1 (CET)
  - Summer (DST): UTC+2 (CEST)
- Postal code: 32-090
- Vehicle registration: KRA
- Website: http://www.slomniki.pl

Słomniki [swɔmˈɲikʲi] is a town in southern Poland, situated in the Lesser Poland Voivodeship. Słomniki lies 24 kilometres (15 miles) north of Kraków, among the hills of Lesser Poland Upland. On December 31, 2010, its population was 4,365, and the town is a center of commerce and services for the local agricultural area.

== Etymology ==
Its name probably comes from a Medieval guild called szłomiarze or szłomniki, who manufactured helmets for royal knights.

== History ==
The village of Słomniki was first mentioned in 1287, as a hunting settlement in the middle of dense forests. At that time, it belonged to Cistercian monks, and was located along a merchant route from Bochnia and Wieliczka to Greater Poland. In the 13th century, Lesser Poland suffered from several Mongol raids (see Mongol invasion of Poland), in which Słomniki was also destroyed. In 1358 King Casimir III the Great granted Słomniki Magdeburg rights charter, and medieval style market square was fashioned, which still exists. It was administratively located in the Kraków Voivodeship in the Lesser Poland Province of the Kingdom of Poland. The town developed, and several Polish rulers visited it in the 15th and 16th centuries. In 1554, Słomniki became one of main centers of Protestant Reformation, when a Calvinist temple was opened here. In 1564, the Polish Reformed Church synod took place in Słomniki. Like most towns in Lesser Poland, Słomniki was completely destroyed in the Swedish invasion of Poland, and the period of prosperity ended.

During the Kościuszko Uprising, Polish units gathered in Słomniki after the Battle of Racławice. On April 6, 1794, at Słomniki market square, Józef Zajączek and Antoni Madaliński were promoted to the rank of general. After the Partitions of Poland, Słomniki briefly belonged to the Habsburg Empire. After the Polish victory in the Austro-Polish War of 1809, it became part of the short-lived Duchy of Warsaw. Following the duchy's dissolution, the town was part of Russian-controlled Congress Poland. The town was a major center of the January Uprising, for which it was stripped of its charter (1870), remaining a village until 1917. In the interwar period (1918–1939), Słomniki belonged to Kielce Voivodeship in reborn Poland. According to the 1921 census, the town had a population of 4,797, 86.9% Polish and 12.9% Jewish by declared nationality.

Following the joint German-Soviet invasion of Poland, which started World War II in September 1939, the village was occupied by Germany until 1945. The occupiers operated a forced labour camp for Jews in the town. The Polish resistance movement was active in Słomniki, including a local unit of the Home Army under the cryptonym "Skowronek" ("Lark").

== Sights ==
Major attraction of the town is Romanesque Revival Corpus Christi church (1888–1893). There are memorials plaques in Polish and Hebrew to local victims of the Holocaust at the former synagogue.

== Transport ==
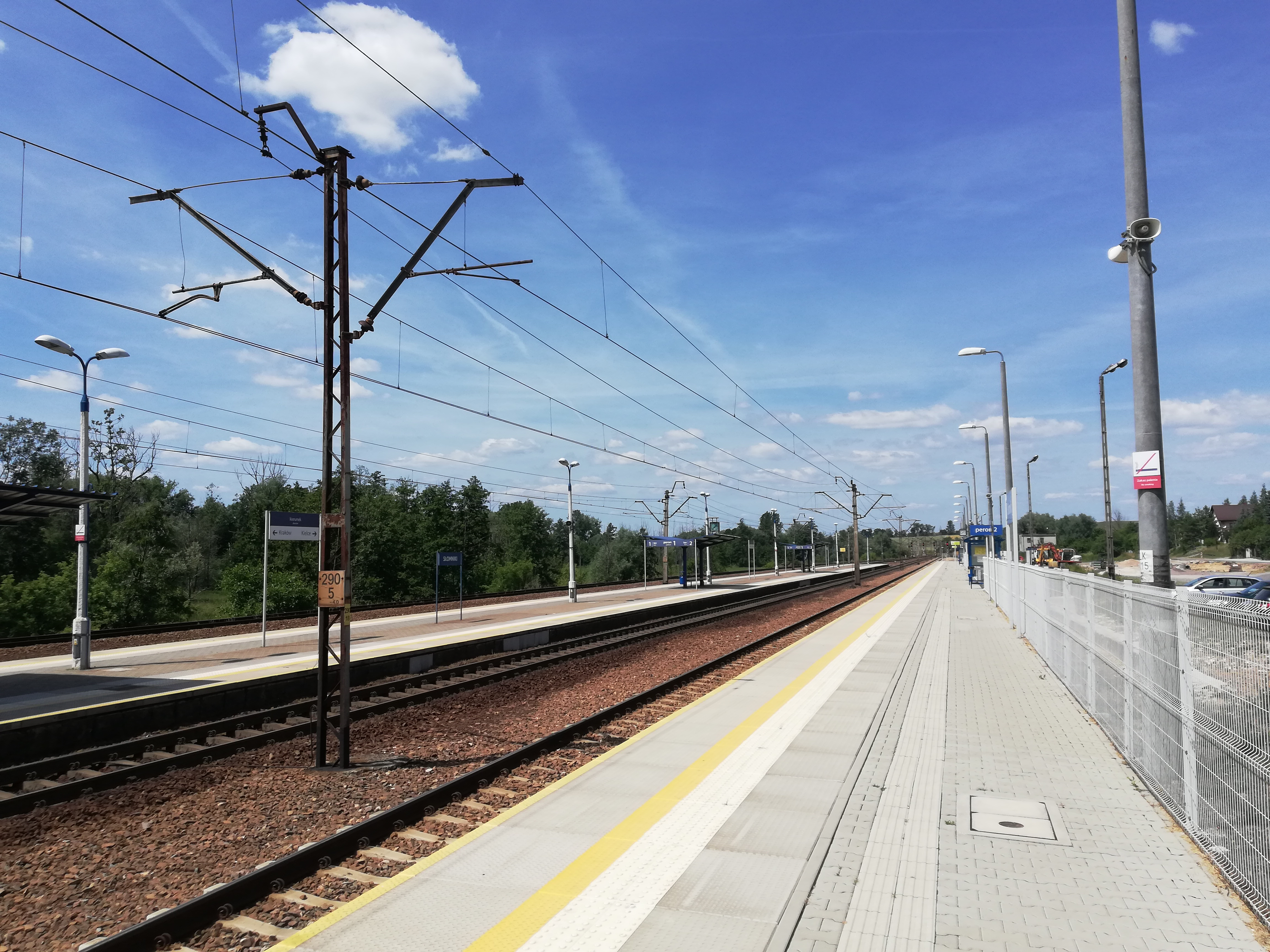
Słomniki train station

The town has two rail stations (Słomniki and Słomniki Miasto), on a major electrified double track railway from Kraków to Warsaw. Słomniki is also served by the Kraków Transit Authority (MPK Kraków), with bus line 222 reaching it from Nowa Huta.

== Culture and education ==
The town has several schools, house of culture, cinema, library and Museum of Słomniki Land.

== Sports ==
Słomniki is home to sports club KS Słomniczanka was founded in 1923, and currently has football and volleyball departments.

== Demographics ==
Historical population

Year	Pop.	±%
1910	4,760	—
1921	4,797	+0.8%
1931	4,998	+4.2%

Year	Pop.	±%
1950	4,099	−18.0%
1960	4,299	+4.9%
2010	4,365	+1.5%
