= Kraków County =

Kraków County Powiat krakowski
- County
- Flag Coat of arms

- Location within the voivodeship
- Coordinates (Kraków): 50°3′41″N 19°56′18″E
- Country: Poland
- Voivodeship: Lesser Poland
- Seat: Kraków
- Gminas: Total 17: Gmina Czernichów; Gmina Igołomia-Wawrzeńczyce; Gmina Iwanowice; Gmina Jerzmanowice-Przeginia; Gmina Kocmyrzów-Luborzyca; Gmina Krzeszowice; Gmina Liszki; Gmina Michałowice; Gmina Mogilany; Gmina Skała; Gmina Skawina; Gmina Słomniki; Gmina Sułoszowa; Gmina Świątniki Górne; Gmina Wielka Wieś; Gmina Zabierzów; Gmina Zielonki

Area
  - Total: 1,229.62 km^{2} (474.76 sq mi)

Population (2019)
  - Total: 278,219
  - Density: 226.264/km^{2} (586.022/sq mi)
  - Urban: 44,926
  - Rural: 233,293
- Car plates: KRA
- Website: www.powiat.krakow.pl

Kraków County (Polish: powiat krakowski) is a unit of territorial administration and local government (powiat) in Lesser Poland Voivodeship, southern Poland. It came into being on January 1, 1999, as a result of the Polish local government reforms passed in 1998. Its administrative seat is the city of Kraków, although the city is not part of the county (it constitutes a separate city with powiat rights). The county contains five towns: Skawina, 12 km (7 mi) south-west of Kraków, Krzeszowice, 24 km (15 mi) west of Kraków, Słomniki, 24 km (15 mi) north-east of Kraków, Skała, 20 km (12 mi) north of Kraków, and Świątniki Górne, 15 km (9 mi) south of Kraków.

The county covers an area of 1,229.62 square kilometres (474.8 sq mi). As of 2019 its total population is 278,219, out of which the population of Skawina is 24,340, that of Krzeszowice is 10,014, that of Słomniki is 4,343, that of Skała is 3,798, that of Świątniki Górne is 2,431, and the rural population is 233,293.

== Neighbouring counties ==
Apart from the city of Kraków, Kraków County is also bordered by Miechów County to the north, Proszowice County and Bochnia County to the east, Wieliczka County to the south-east, Myślenice County to the south, Wadowice County and Chrzanów County to the west, and Olkusz County to the north-west.

== Administrative division ==
The county is subdivided into 17 gminas (five urban-rural and 12 rural). These are listed in the following table, in descending order of population.

Gmina	Type	Area (km^{2})	Population (2019)	Seat
Gmina Skawina	urban-rural	100.2	43,554	Skawina
Gmina Krzeszowice	urban-rural	139.4	32,126	Krzeszowice
Gmina Zabierzów	rural	99.6	26,622	Zabierzów
Gmina Zielonki	rural	48.4	22,856	Zielonki
Gmina Liszki	rural	72.0	17,369	Liszki
Gmina Kocmyrzów-Luborzyca	rural	82.5	15,709	Luborzyca
Gmina Czernichów	rural	83.8	14,598	Czernichów
Gmina Mogilany	rural	43.6	14,110	Mogilany
Gmina Słomniki	urban-rural	111.4	13,692	Słomniki
Gmina Wielka Wieś	rural	48.1	12,533	Wielka Wieś
Gmina Jerzmanowice-Przeginia	rural	68.4	10,976	Jerzmanowice
Gmina Michałowice	rural	51.3	10,641	Michałowice
Gmina Skała	urban-rural	74.3	10,580	Skała
Gmina Świątniki Górne	urban-rural	20.2	10,155	Świątniki Górne
Gmina Iwanowice	rural	70.6	9,133	Iwanowice
Gmina Igołomia-Wawrzeńczyce	rural	62.6	7,721	Wawrzeńczyce
Gmina Sułoszowa	rural	53.4	5,844	Sułoszowa

== Symbols ==
Kraków's county's symbols can be blazoned as follows:

Coat of arms: A traditional Iberian shield gules, an eagle head argent erased beaked, langued and crowned Or.

Flag: Per fess argent and gules, a narrow fess Or, overall and occupying 3/5 of the flag's height the county's coat of arms.
