= Baranovka, Russia =

Baranovka (Russian: Барановка) is the name of several rural localities in Russia.

== Altai Krai ==
As of 2010, one rural locality in Altai Krai bears this name:

- Baranovka, Altai Krai, a selo in Baranovsky Selsoviet of Zmeinogorsky District

== Astrakhan Oblast ==
As of 2010, four rural localities in Astrakhan Oblast bear this name:

- Baranovka, Chernoyarsky District, Astrakhan Oblast, a selo in Chernoyarsky Selsoviet of Chernoyarsky District
- Baranovka, Krasnoyarsky District, Astrakhan Oblast, a settlement in Yubileyninsky Selsoviet of Krasnoyarsky District
- Baranovka, Narimanovsky District, Astrakhan Oblast, a selo in Baranovsky Selsoviet of Narimanovsky District
- Baranovka, Volodarsky District, Astrakhan Oblast, a selo in Kalininsky Selsoviet of Volodarsky District

== Bryansk Oblast ==
As of 2010, three rural localities in Bryansk Oblast bear this name:

- Baranovka, Karachevsky District, Bryansk Oblast, a village in Pervomaysky Selsoviet of Karachevsky District
- Baranovka, Rognedinsky District, Bryansk Oblast, a village in Sharovichsky Selsoviet of Rognedinsky District
- Baranovka, Zlynkovsky District, Bryansk Oblast, a village in Kozhanovsky Selsoviet of Zlynkovsky District

== Chelyabinsk Oblast ==
As of 2010, one rural locality in Chelyabinsk Oblast bears this name:

- Baranovka, Chelyabinsk Oblast, a village in Shakhmatovsky Selsoviet of Chebarkulsky District

== Kaluga Oblast ==
As of 2010, four rural localities in Kaluga Oblast bear this name:

- Baranovka, Babyninsky District, Kaluga Oblast, a village in Babyninsky District
- Baranovka, Khvastovichsky District, Kaluga Oblast, a village in Khvastovichsky District
- Baranovka, Maloyaroslavetsky District, Kaluga Oblast, a village in Maloyaroslavetsky District
- Baranovka, Yukhnovsky District, Kaluga Oblast, a village in Yukhnovsky District

== Kemerovo Oblast ==
As of 2010, one rural locality in Kemerovo Oblast bears this name:

- Baranovka, Kemerovo Oblast, a selo in Shcheglovskaya Rural Territory of Kemerovsky District

== Kirov Oblast ==
As of 2010, one rural locality in Kirov Oblast bears this name:

- Baranovka, Kirov Oblast, a settlement under the administrative jurisdiction of the Town of Kirs in Verkhnekamsky District

== Kostroma Oblast ==
As of 2010, one rural locality in Kostroma Oblast bears this name:

- Baranovka, Kostroma Oblast, a village in Shangskoye Settlement of Sharyinsky District

== Krasnodar Krai ==
As of 2010, two rural localities in Krasnodar Krai bear this name:

- Baranovka, Khostinsky City District, Sochi, Krasnodar Krai, a selo in Baranovsky Rural Okrug under the jurisdiction of Khostinsky City District of the City of Sochi
- Baranovka, Lazarevsky City District, Sochi, Krasnodar Krai, a selo in Volkovsky Rural Okrug under the jurisdiction of Lazarevsky City District of the City of Sochi

== Kurgan Oblast ==
As of 2010, one rural locality in Kurgan Oblast bears this name:

- Baranovka, Kurgan Oblast, a village in Karasinsky Selsoviet of Yurgamyshsky District

== Lipetsk Oblast ==
As of 2010, three rural localities in Lipetsk Oblast bear this name:

- Baranovka, Dankovsky District, Lipetsk Oblast, a village in Balovnevsky Selsoviet of Dankovsky District
- Baranovka, Izmalkovsky District, Lipetsk Oblast, a village in Domovinsky Selsoviet of Izmalkovsky District
- Baranovka, Yeletsky District, Lipetsk Oblast, a village in Fedorovsky Selsoviet of Yeletsky District

== Republic of Mordovia ==
As of 2010, two rural localities in the Republic of Mordovia bear this name:

- Baranovka, Atyuryevsky District, Republic of Mordovia, a village in Atyuryevsky Selsoviet of Atyuryevsky District
- Baranovka, Krasnoslobodsky District, Republic of Mordovia, a village in Starogoryashinsky Selsoviet of Krasnoslobodsky District

== Moscow Oblast ==
As of 2010, one rural locality in Moscow Oblast bears this name:

- Baranovka, Moscow Oblast, a village in Akatyevskoye Rural Settlement of Kolomensky District

== Nizhny Novgorod Oblast ==
As of 2010, one rural locality in Nizhny Novgorod Oblast bears this name:

- Baranovka, Nizhny Novgorod Oblast, a settlement in Naryshkinsky Selsoviet of Voznesensky District

== Oryol Oblast ==
As of 2010, one rural locality in Oryol Oblast bears this name:

- Baranovka, Oryol Oblast, a village in Koshelevsky Selsoviet of Sverdlovsky District

== Perm Krai ==
As of 2010, two rural localities in Perm Krai bear this name:

- Baranovka, Kungursky District, Perm Krai, a village in Kungursky District
- Baranovka, Yelovsky District, Perm Krai, a village in Yelovsky District

== Pskov Oblast ==
As of 2010, two rural localities in Pskov Oblast bear this name:

- Baranovka, Gdovsky District, Pskov Oblast, a village in Gdovsky District
- Baranovka, Pskovsky District, Pskov Oblast, a village in Pskovsky District

== Ryazan Oblast ==
As of 2010, two rural localities in Ryazan Oblast bear this name:

- Baranovka, Mikhaylovsky District, Ryazan Oblast, a village in Malinkovsky Rural Okrug of Mikhaylovsky District
- Baranovka, Miloslavsky District, Ryazan Oblast, a village in Gornyatsky Rural Okrug of Miloslavsky District

== Saratov Oblast ==
As of 2010, two rural localities in Saratov Oblast bear this name:

- Baranovka, Atkarsky District, Saratov Oblast, a selo in Atkarsky District
- Baranovka, Volsky District, Saratov Oblast, a selo in Volsky District

== Smolensk Oblast ==
As of 2010, three rural localities in Smolensk Oblast bear this name:

- Baranovka, Monastyrshchinsky District, Smolensk Oblast, a village in Lyubavichskoye Rural Settlement of Monastyrshchinsky District
- Baranovka, Pochinkovsky District, Smolensk Oblast, a village in Klimshchinskoye Rural Settlement of Pochinkovsky District
- Baranovka, Tyomkinsky District, Smolensk Oblast, a village in Medvedevskoye Rural Settlement of Tyomkinsky District

== Tambov Oblast ==
As of 2010, two rural localities in Tambov Oblast bear this name:

- Baranovka, Petrovsky District, Tambov Oblast, a village in Volchkovsky Selsoviet of Petrovsky District
- Baranovka, Tokaryovsky District, Tambov Oblast, a village in Bezukladovsky Selsoviet of Tokaryovsky District

== Tula Oblast ==
As of 2010, four rural localities in Tula Oblast bear this name:

- Baranovka, Arkhangelsky Rural Okrug, Kamensky District, Tula Oblast, a village in Arkhangelsky Rural Okrug of Kamensky District
- Baranovka, Sitovsky Rural Okrug, Kamensky District, Tula Oblast, a village in Sitovsky Rural Okrug of Kamensky District
- Baranovka, Kimovsky District, Tula Oblast, a village in Baranovsky Rural Okrug of Kimovsky District
- Baranovka, Kurkinsky District, Tula Oblast, a village in Samarskaya Volost of Kurkinsky District

== Tver Oblast ==
As of 2010, one rural locality in Tver Oblast bears this name:

- Baranovka, Tver Oblast, a village in Likhoslavlsky District

== Ulyanovsk Oblast ==
As of 2010, one rural locality in Ulyanovsk Oblast bears this name:

- Baranovka, Ulyanovsk Oblast, a selo in Baranovsky Rural Okrug of Nikolayevsky District

== Vladimir Oblast ==
As of 2010, one rural locality in Vladimir Oblast bears this name:

- Baranovka, Vladimir Oblast, a village in Kolchuginsky District

== Volgograd Oblast ==
As of 2010, two rural localities in Volgograd Oblast bear this name:

- Baranovka, Kamyshinsky District, Volgograd Oblast, a selo in Petruninsky Selsoviet of Kamyshinsky District
- Baranovka, Nikolayevsky District, Volgograd Oblast, a khutor in Baranovsky Selsoviet of Nikolayevsky District
