= Baranówka =

Baranówka may refer to the following places in Poland:

- Baranówka, Lublin Voivodeship (east Poland)
- Baranówka, Lesser Poland Voivodeship (south Poland)
- Baranówka, Otwock County in Masovian Voivodeship (east-central Poland)
- Baranówka, Warmian-Masurian Voivodeship (north Poland)
- Baranówka (Rzeszów) (district of Rzeszów), Podkarpackie Voivodeship (south-east Poland)

== See also ==
- Baranovka
- Baranovka, Russia
- Baranivka
