= Pieskowa Skała =

Castle in Poland

Coordinates: 50°14′39″N 19°46′48″E

Pieskowa Skała Castle
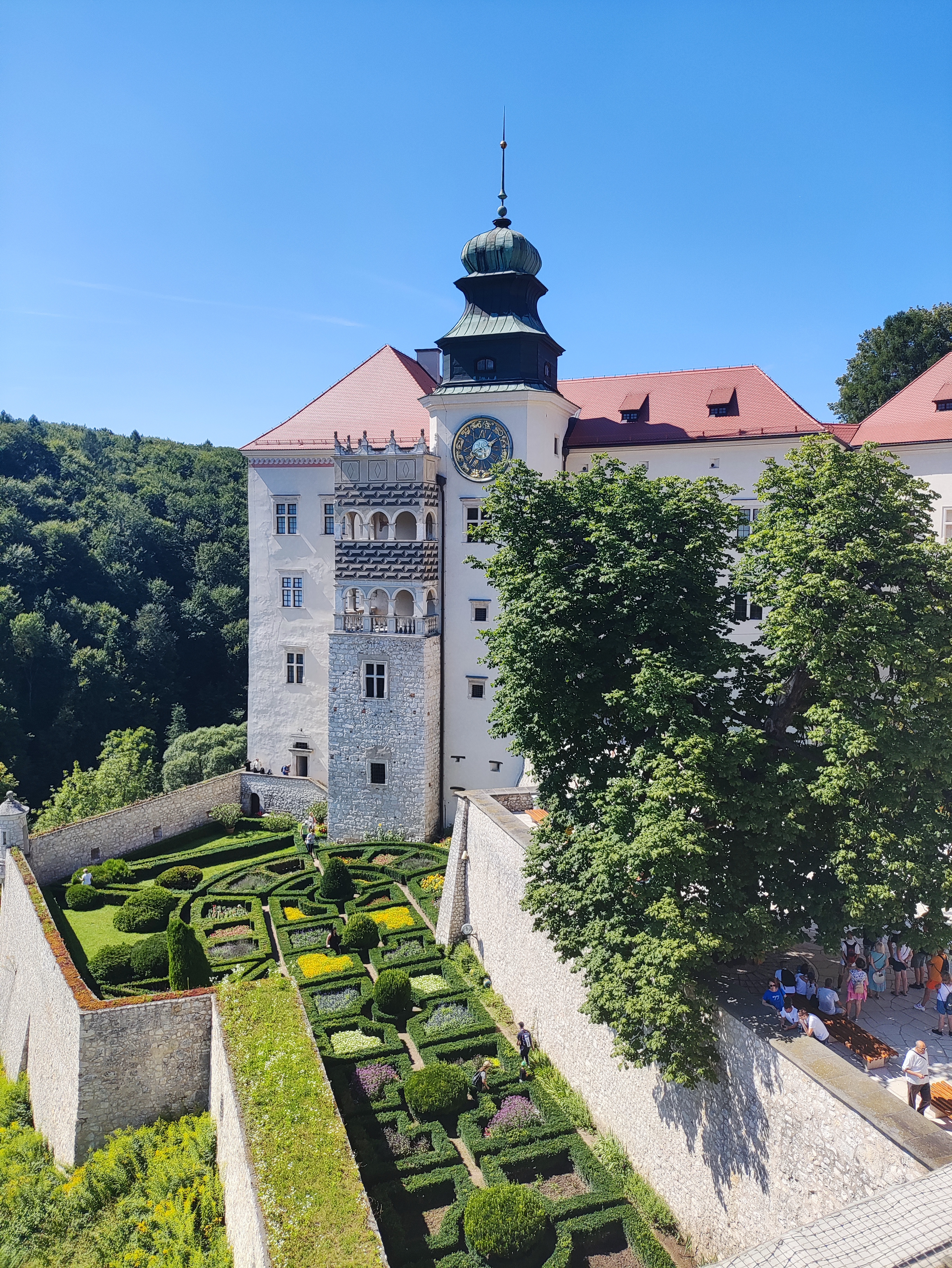
- General view from the bastion.
- Interactive map of the Pieskowa Skała Castle area

General information
- Architectural style: Renaissance - Mannerism
- Location: Sułoszowa, Poland

Pieskowa Skała (pronounced [pʲɛsˈkɔva ˈskawa]; Polish for Little Dog's Rock) is a limestone cliff in the valley of river Prądnik, Poland, best known for its Renaissance castle. It is located within the boundaries of the Ojców National Park, 27 km north-northwest of Kraków, close to the village of Sułoszowa. The castle was first mentioned in Latin documents of Polish king Władysław I the Elbow-high (Władysław Łokietek) before 1315, as "castrum Peskenstein".

== History ==
Pieskowa Skała castle, built by King Casimir III the Great (Kazimierz Wielki), is one of the best-known examples of a defensive Polish Renaissance architecture. It was erected in the first half of the 14th century. It is part of the chain of fortified castles along the Trail of the Eagle's Nests, along the highland plane of the Polish Jura (Polish: Jura Krakowsko-Częstochowska) extending north-west from Kraków to the city of Częstochowa.

The castle was renovated and donated in 1377 by king Louis I of Hungary (Ludwik Węgierski) to Piotr Szafraniec of Łuczyce, according to the 15th century chronicler Jan Długosz. The Szafraniec family gained the full ownership rights of the castle in 1422 from King Władysław Jagiełło in recognition of faithful service at the Battle of Grunwald by Piotr Szafraniec, the chamberlain of Kraków.

The castle was rebuilt in 1542–1544 by Niccolò Castiglione with participation from Gabriel Słoński of Kraków. The sponsor of the castle's reconstruction in the mannerist style was the Calvinist, Stanisław Szafraniec, voivode of Sandomierz. At that time the original medieval tower was transformed into a scenic double loggia decorated in the sgraffito technique. Between 1557 and 1578, the trapezoid shape courtyard was surrounded at the level of two upper storeys by arcades, embellished with 21 mascarons. The arcade risalit above the gate is a 17th-century addition.

The last owner of the castle of Szafraniec family was Jędrzej, Stanisław's son, who died childless in 1608. After his death the estate was purchased by Maciej Łubnicki and later by the Zebrzydowski family. In 1640 Michał Zebrzydowski built the bastion fortifications with baroque gate and a chapel.

In 1718 it was destroyed by a fire which eventually lead to it being rebuilt as a seat of the Wielopolski family. In the period that it was held by the Wielopolskis the castle notably hosted King Stanisław August Poniatowski in 1787.

In 1903 it was bought by the Pieskowa Skała Society led by Adolf Dygasiński and with time turned over to the Polish state and meticulously restored.

== Popular culture ==
The castle has been featured in many films and TV series including More Than Life At Stake (1968), Janosik (1971), The Ring and the Rose (1986), With Fire and Sword (1999), and The Amazing Race (2006). It was also depicted on a 4-zloty stamp issued by the Polish Post in 1971, which remained in circulation until 1994. It was part of the Polish Castles series.

== Gallery ==
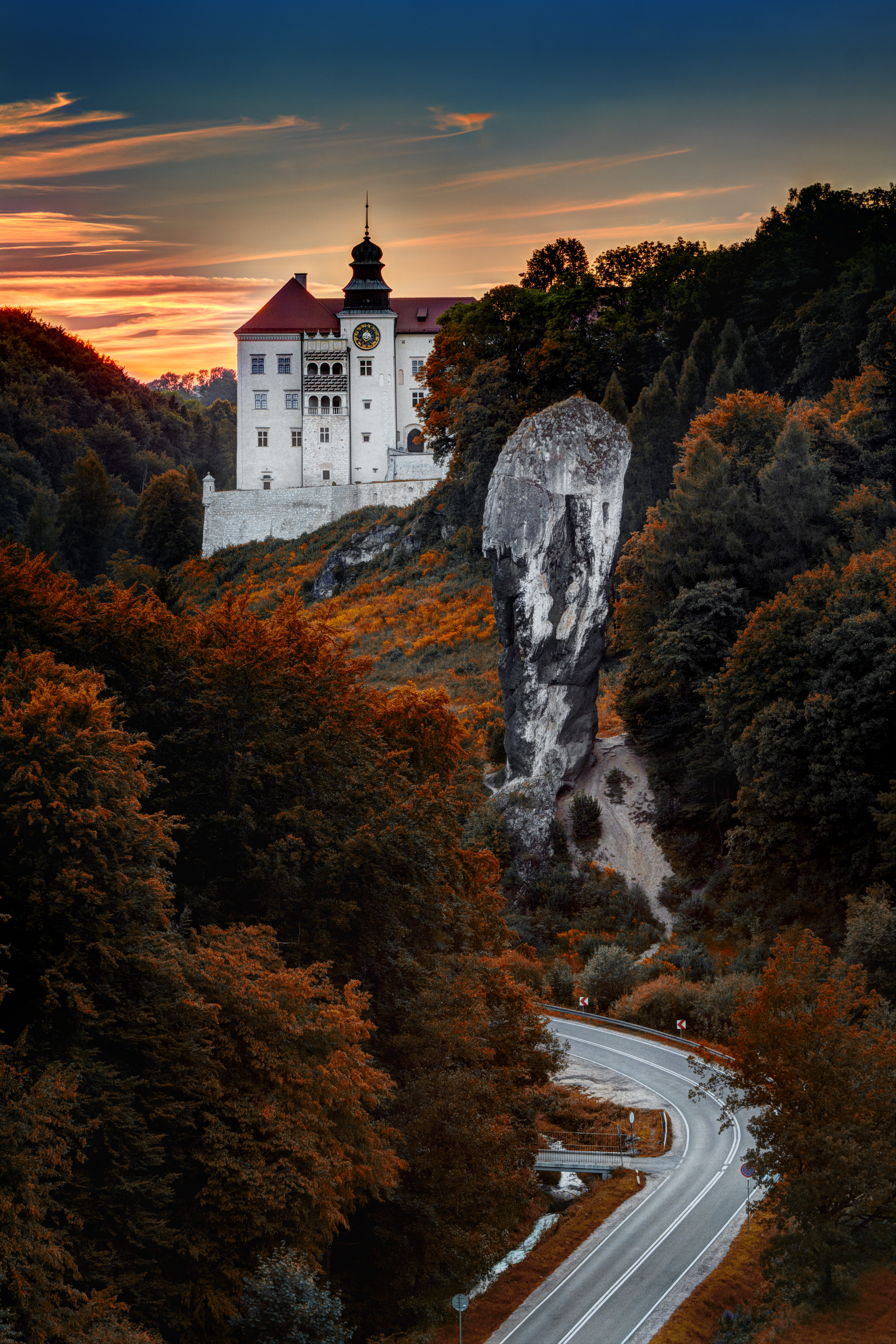
View of the Hercules' Club rock formation and Pieskowa Skała Castle

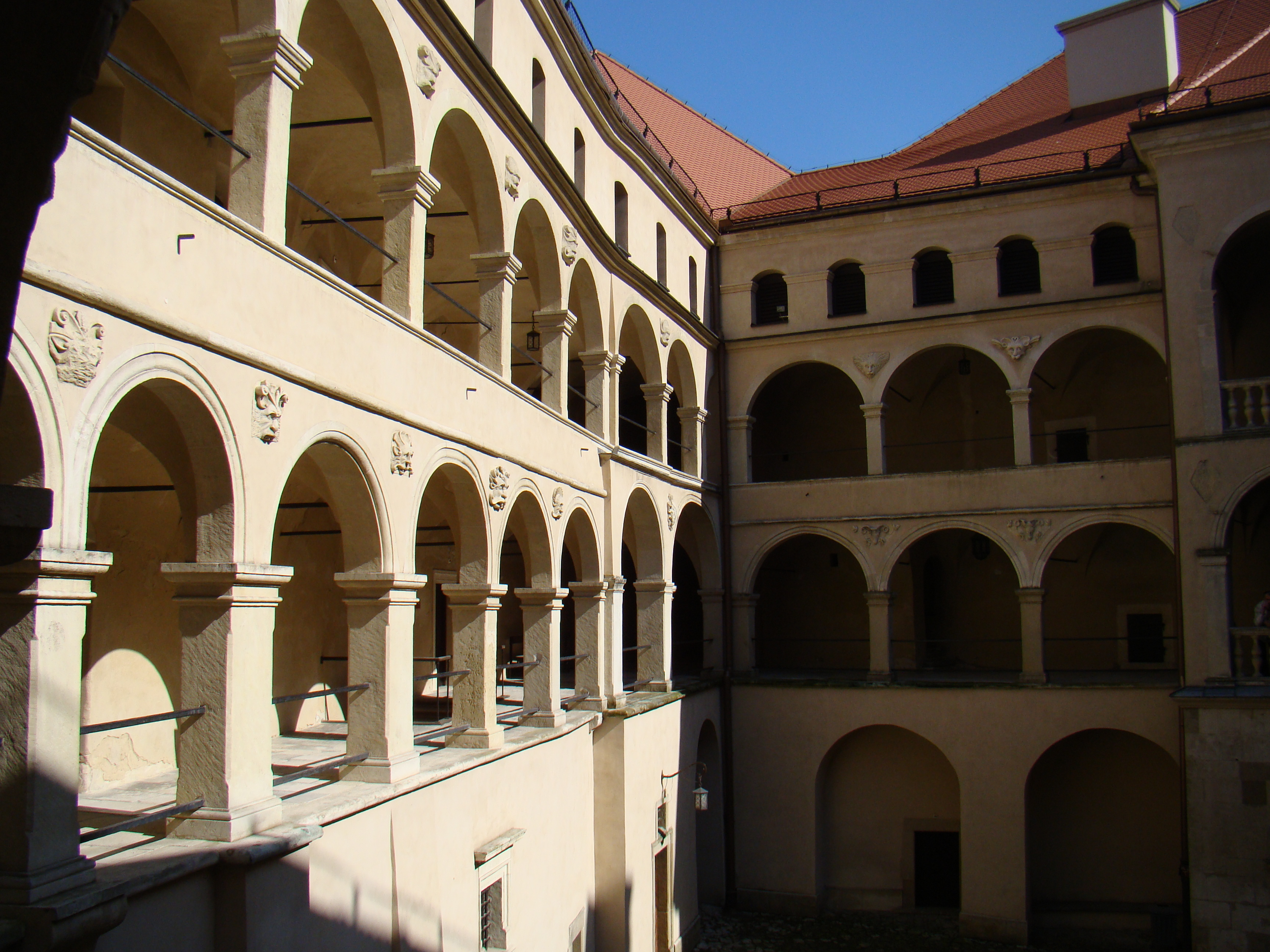
Inner courtyard (before renovation)

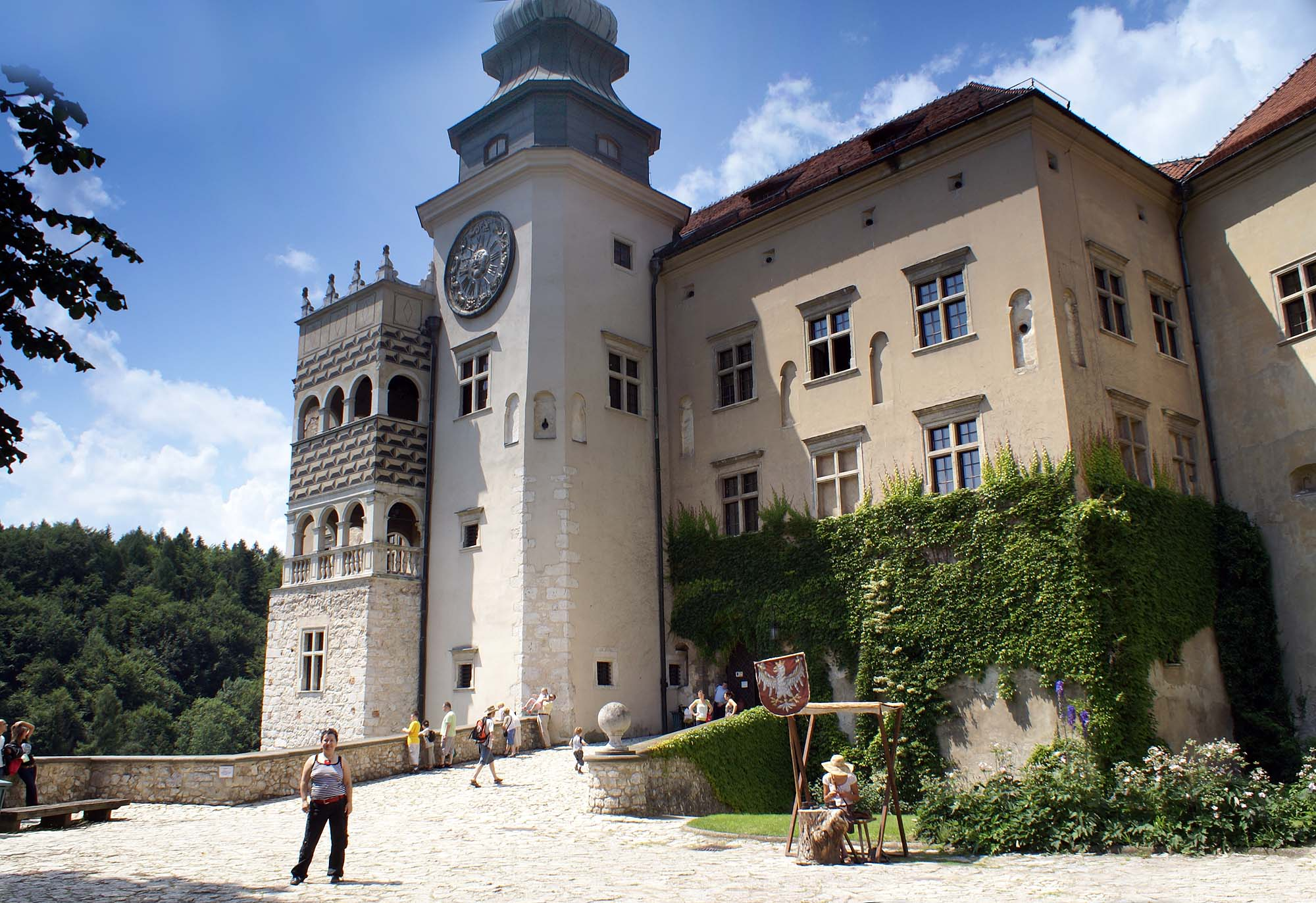
Fortified entrance

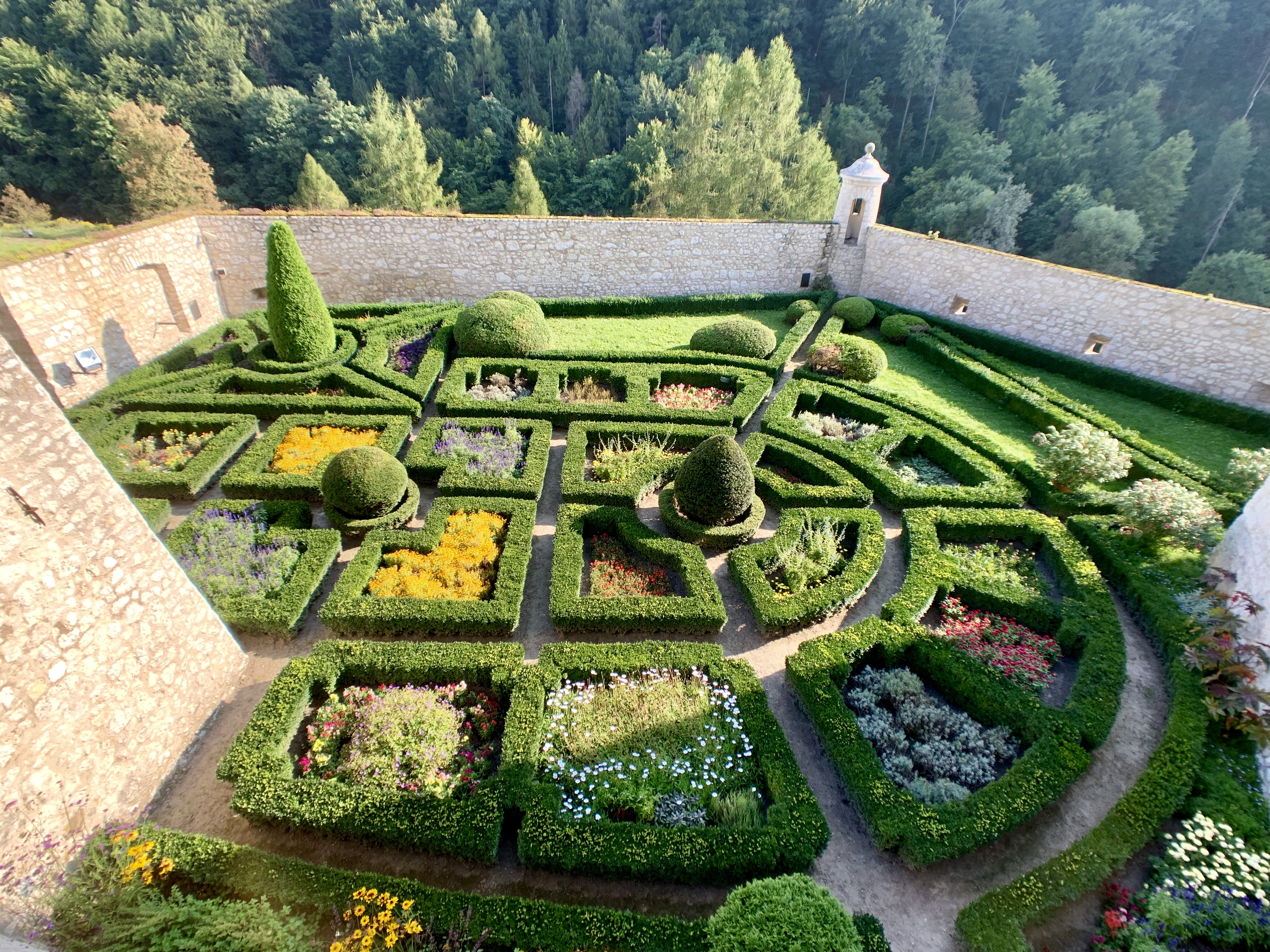
Castle garden

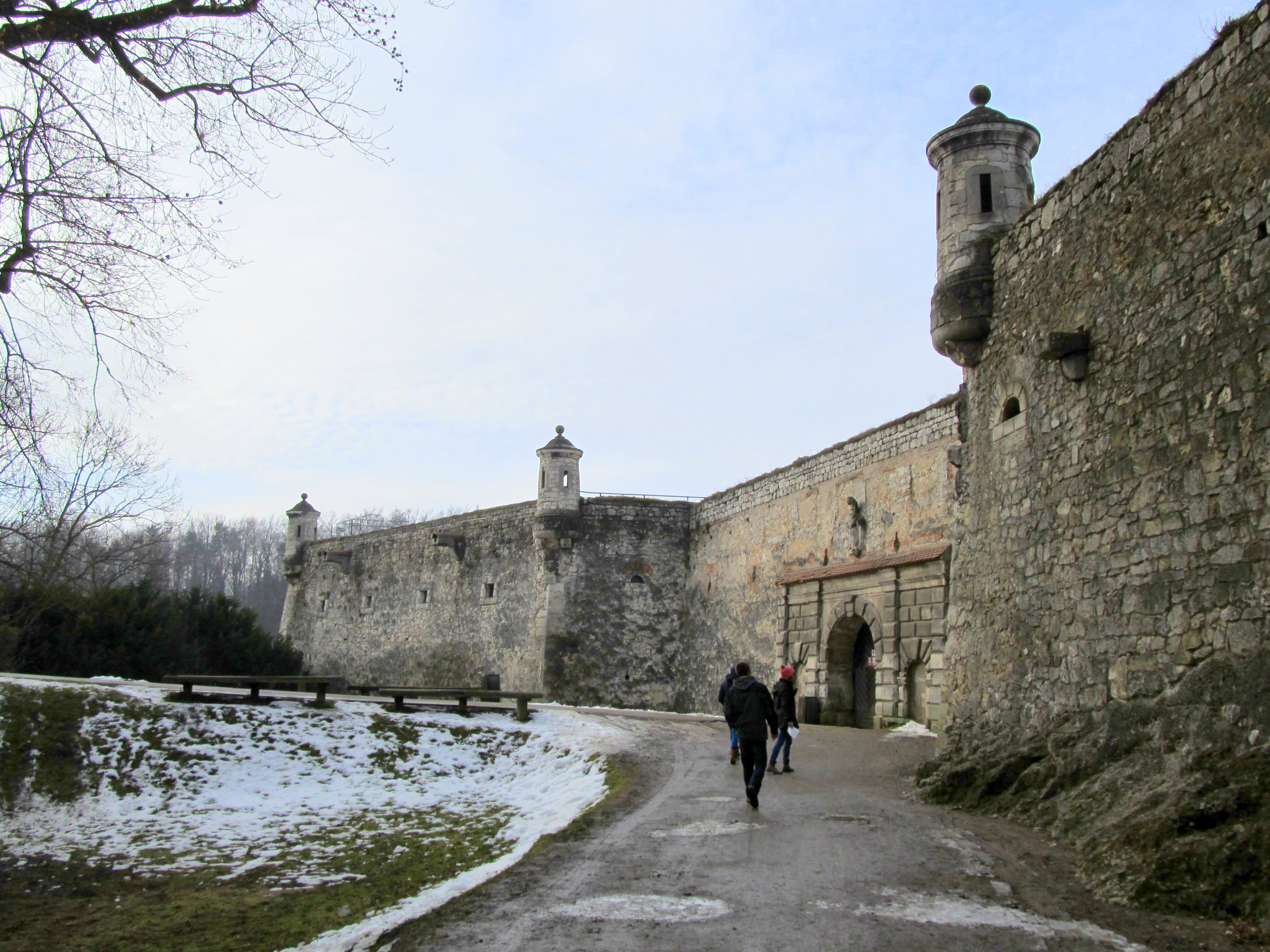
Castle walls

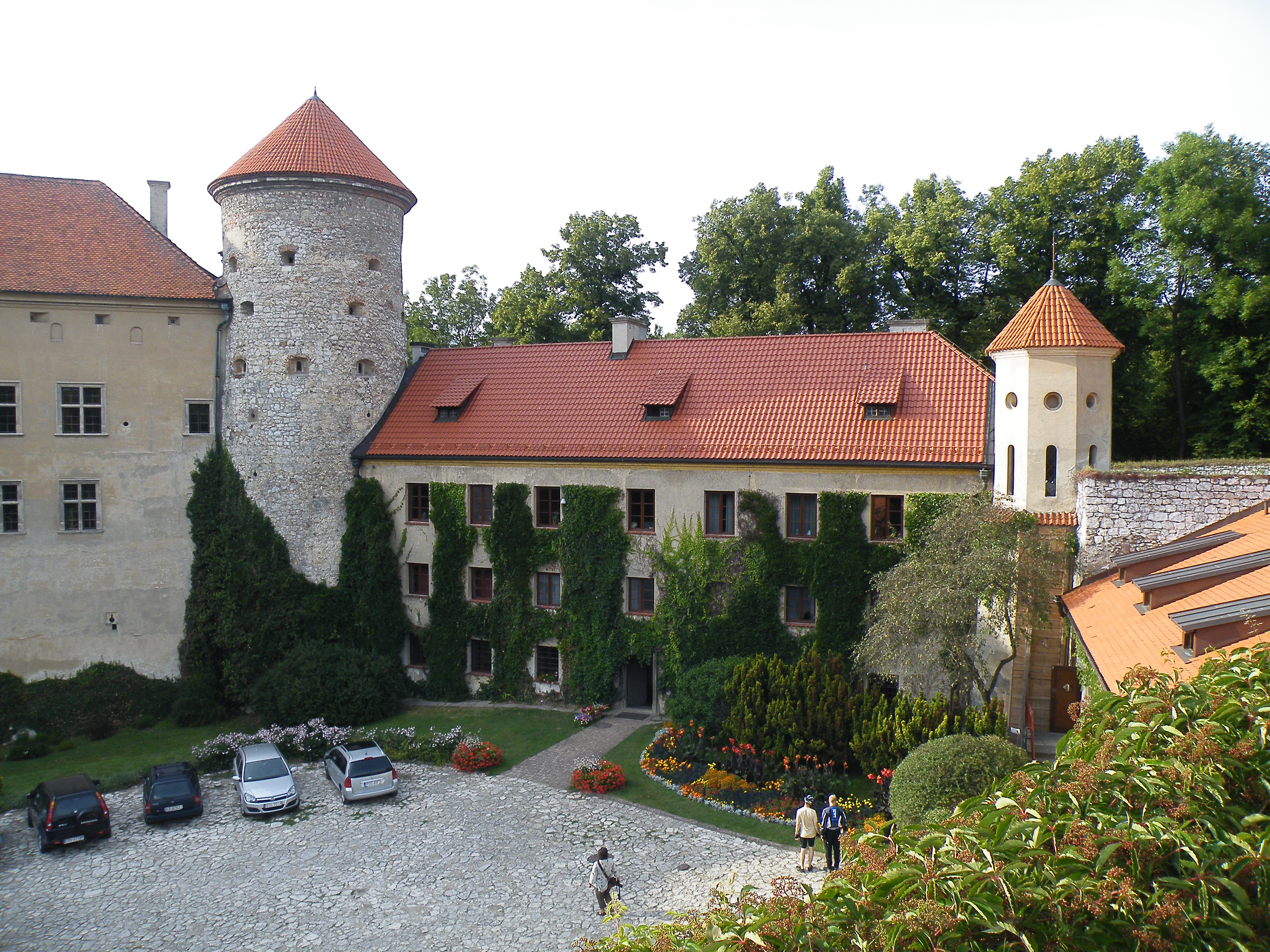
Outer courtyard

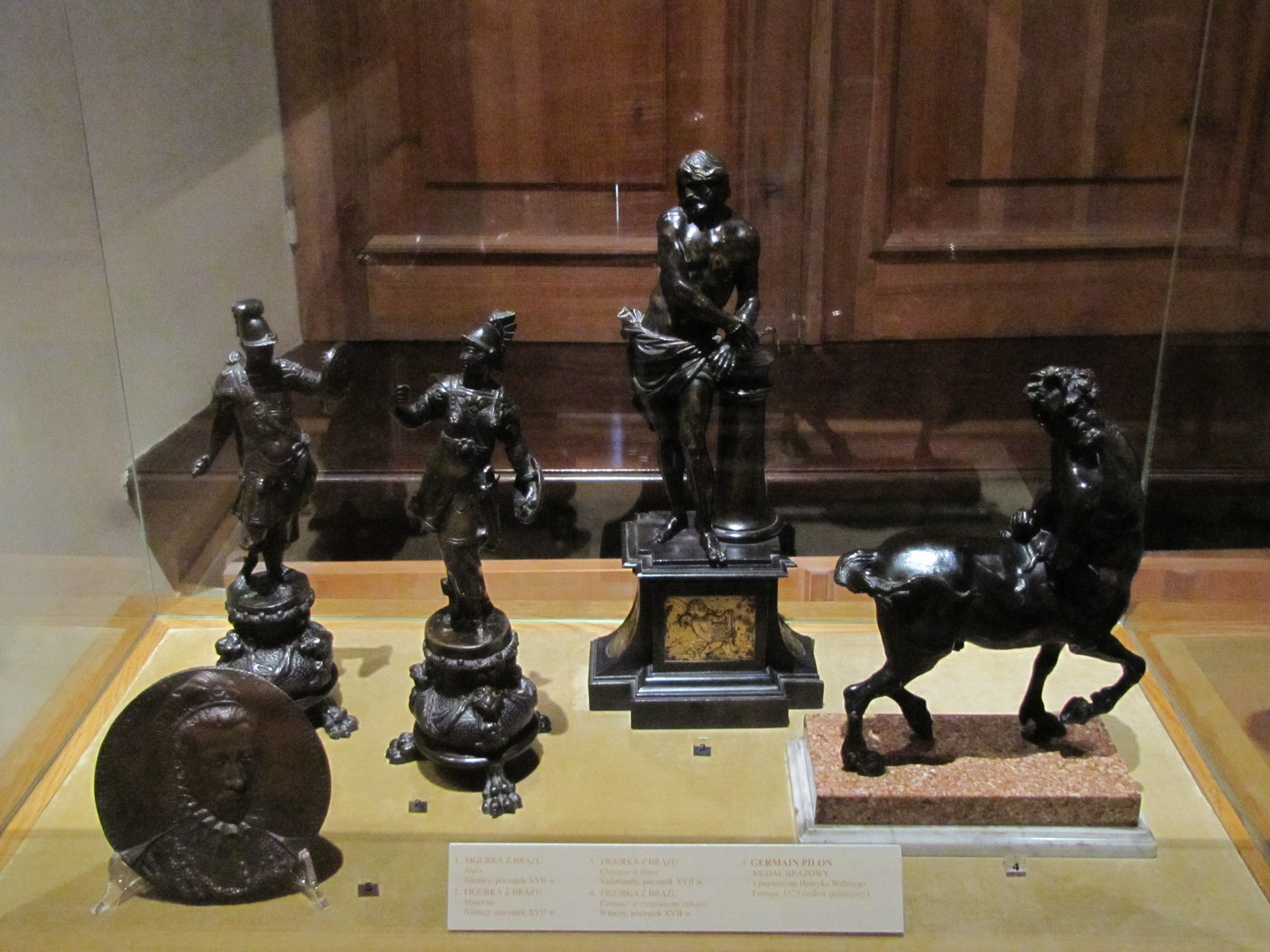
Artworks inside the castle museum

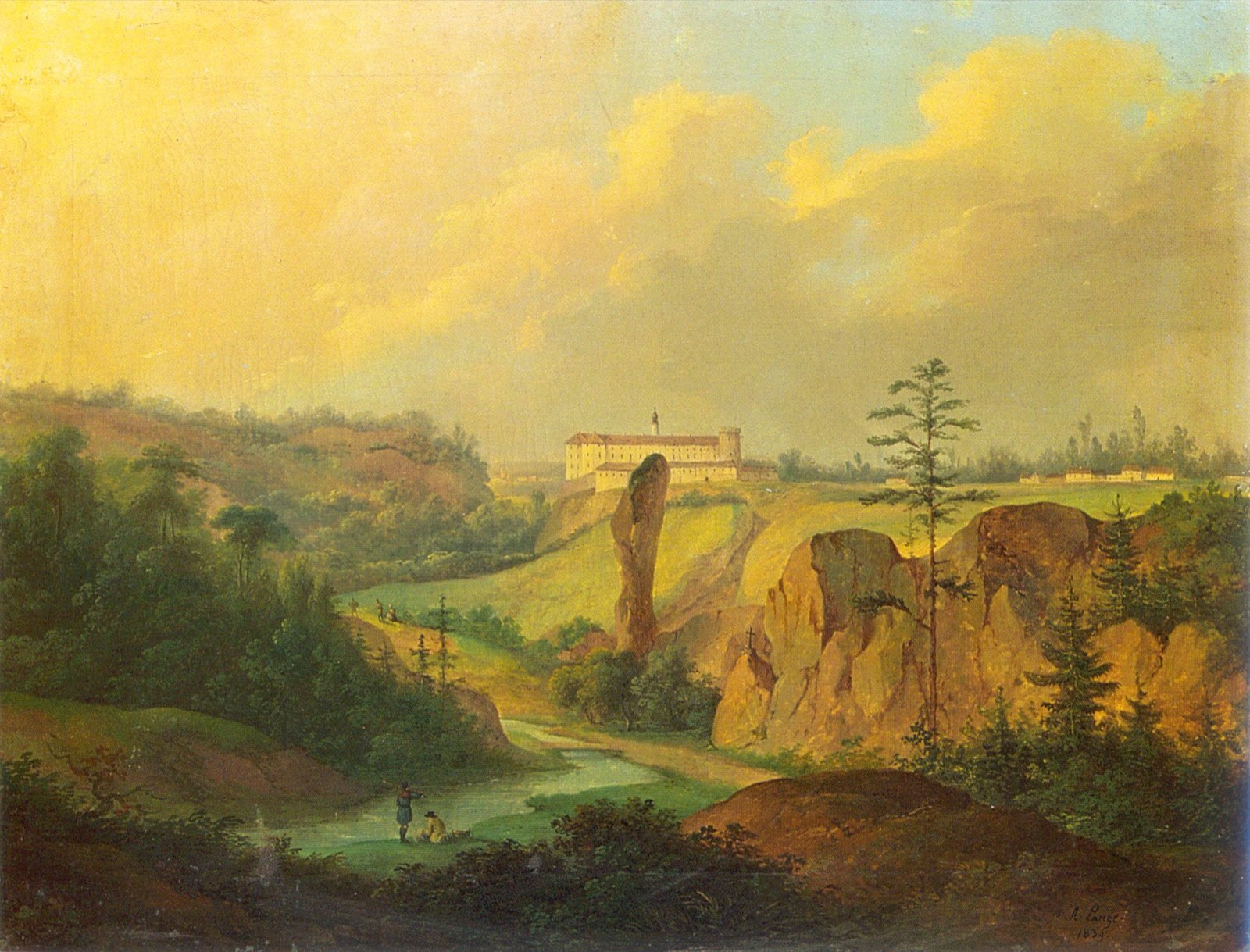
View from Ojców by Antoni Lange, 1839

== See also ==
- Maczuga Herkulesa, a 30 meters tall limestone Monadnock nearby
- Trail of the Eagles' Nests between Częstochowa and Kraków
- List of mannerist structures in Southern Poland
- Castles in Poland
