= Głęboka =

Głęboka may refer to the following places in Poland:

- Głęboka, Strzelin County in Lower Silesian Voivodeship (south-west Poland)
- Głęboka, Ząbkowice County in Lower Silesian Voivodeship (south-west Poland)
- Głęboka, Gorlice County in Lesser Poland Voivodeship (south Poland)
- Głęboka, Kraków County in Lesser Poland Voivodeship (south Poland)
- Głęboka, Masovian Voivodeship (east-central Poland)
- Głęboka, Lubusz Voivodeship (west Poland)
