= Marszowice =

Marszowice may refer to the following places in Poland:

- Marszowice, Wrocław (south-west Poland)
- Marszowice, Lower Silesian Voivodeship (south-west Poland)
- Marszowice, Kraków County in Lesser Poland Voivodeship (south Poland)
- Marszowice, Wieliczka County in Lesser Poland Voivodeship (south Poland)
