= Piotr Michałowski =

Polish artist

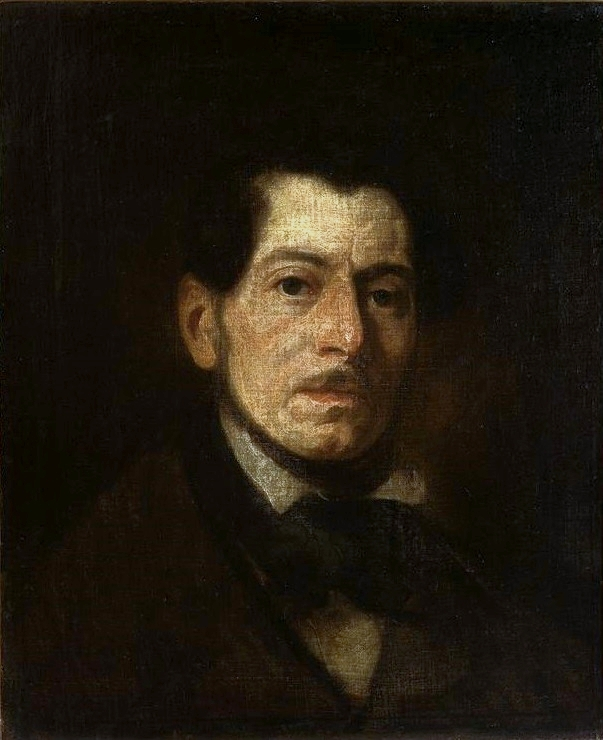
- Self-portrait, Piotr Michałowski, 1850
- Born: July 2, 1800; Kraków
- Died: June 9, 1855 (aged 54); Krzysztoforzyce, Kraków
- Spouse: Julia Olimpia Michałowska

Piotr Michałowski (July 2, 1800 – June 9, 1855) was a Polish painter of the Romantic period, especially known for his many portraits, and oil studies of horses. Broadly educated, he was also a social activist, legal advocate, city administrator and President of the Kraków Agricultural Society (starting in 1853). The Sukiennice Museum, a division of the National Museum in Kraków, contains a room that is named after him and devoted to Michałowski's work.

== Career ==
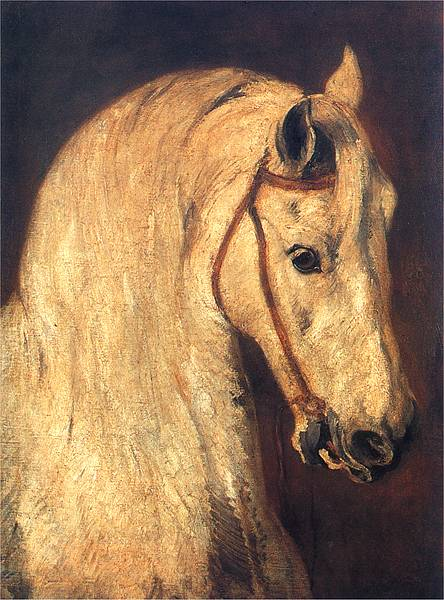
Glowa Konia, study of horse's head, Piotr Michałowski, 1846, National Museum in Kraków

Michałowski was born at an estate in Krzysztoforzyce outside Kraków, the son of landowner Józef Michałowski, senator in the Free City of Kraków. His artistic talent developed at an early age of 13 under the watchful eye of several artists including Michał Stachowicz, Józef Brodowski (1817) and Franciszek Lampi. He formally studied a broad range of subjects at the Jagiellonian University including classical philosophy, agriculture and mathematics.

During the November Uprising against the Russian rulership, Michałowski helped run a Polish munition factory. To avoid capture, he escaped to Paris, France with his new wife Julia Ostrowska and her father. While in Paris, he continued his studies of painting and anatomy with Nicolas Toussaint Charlet (1832–1835), greatly influenced by the art of Théodore Géricault, Rembrandt and Velázquez. His watercolour studies of horses became very popular in France, sold by local art dealers since 1833 to English, German and American collectors.

Michałowski returned to Kraków in 1835 and in 1837 settled into his family estate in Krzysztoforzyce. In the 1840s and 1850s he produced numerous equestrian paintings and dramatic landscapes including his famous Romantic "Battle of Somosierra" (1844–1855, several versions), "Parade before Napoleon" and other battle sites. When Pablo Picasso visited Poland in 1948, he saw Michałowski's work at the National Museum in Warsaw and shouted, "Here, painter!"

Poland's battle sites by Michałowski
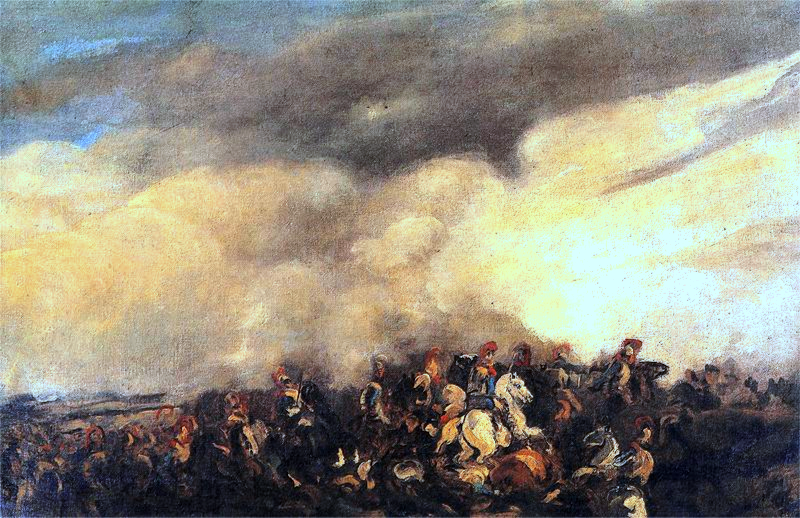
Napoleonic battle

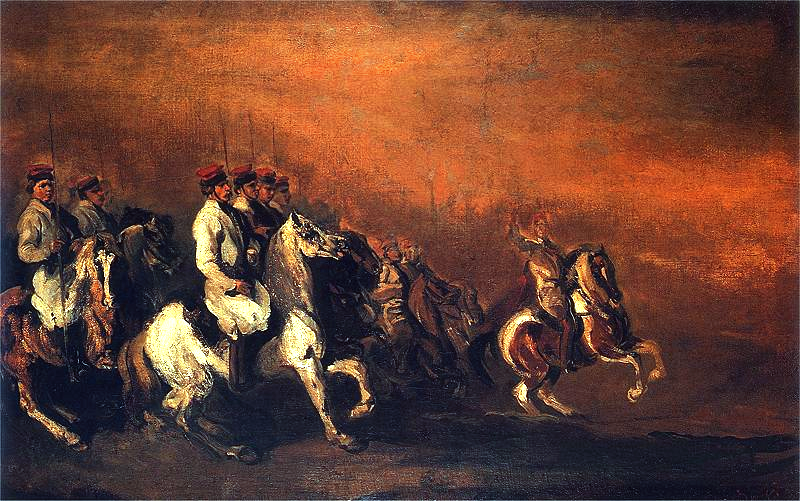
Contingent from Kraków

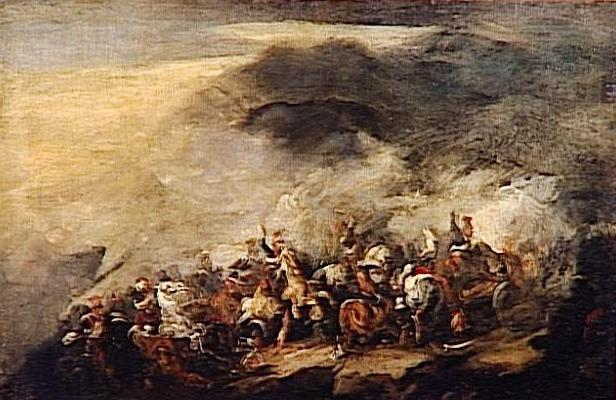
Battle of Somosierra, Musée du Louvre

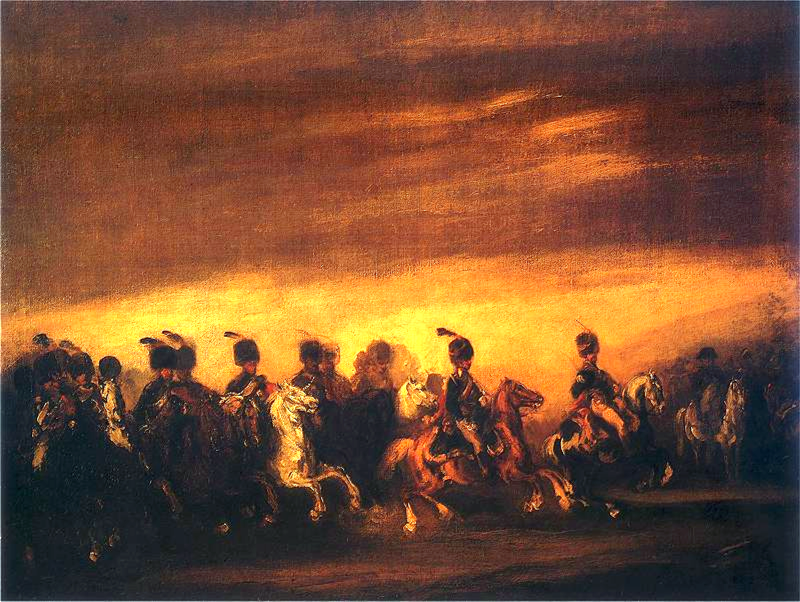
Napoleonic parade

== See also ==
- Polish Romantic Jan Nepomucen Głowacki, the father of Polish school of landscape painting
