= Baranovka =

Baranovka may refer to:

- Baranovka, Russia, name of several rural localities in Russia
- Baranivka (Baranovka), name of several inhabited localities in Ukraine
