= Zastów =

- Village
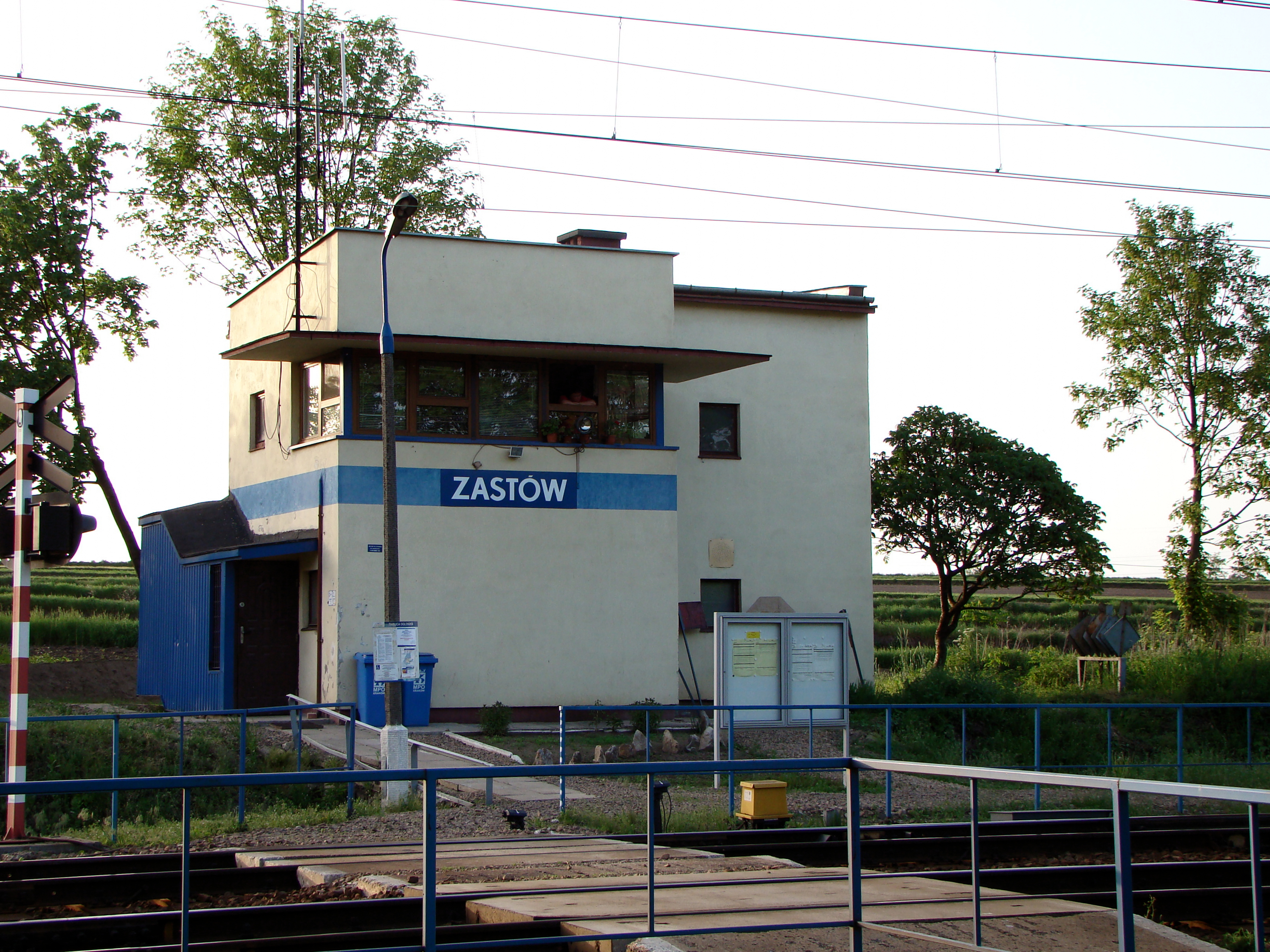
- Railway station

- Location within Poland
- Coordinates: 50°7′18″N 20°3′13″E
- Country: Poland
- Voivodeship: Lesser Poland
- County: Kraków
- Gmina: Kocmyrzów-Luborzyca
- Population: 610

Zastów [ˈzastuf] is a village in the administrative district of Gmina Kocmyrzów-Luborzyca, within Kraków County, Lesser Poland Voivodeship, in southern Poland. The village is located in the historical region Galicia.
