= Czulice =

- Village
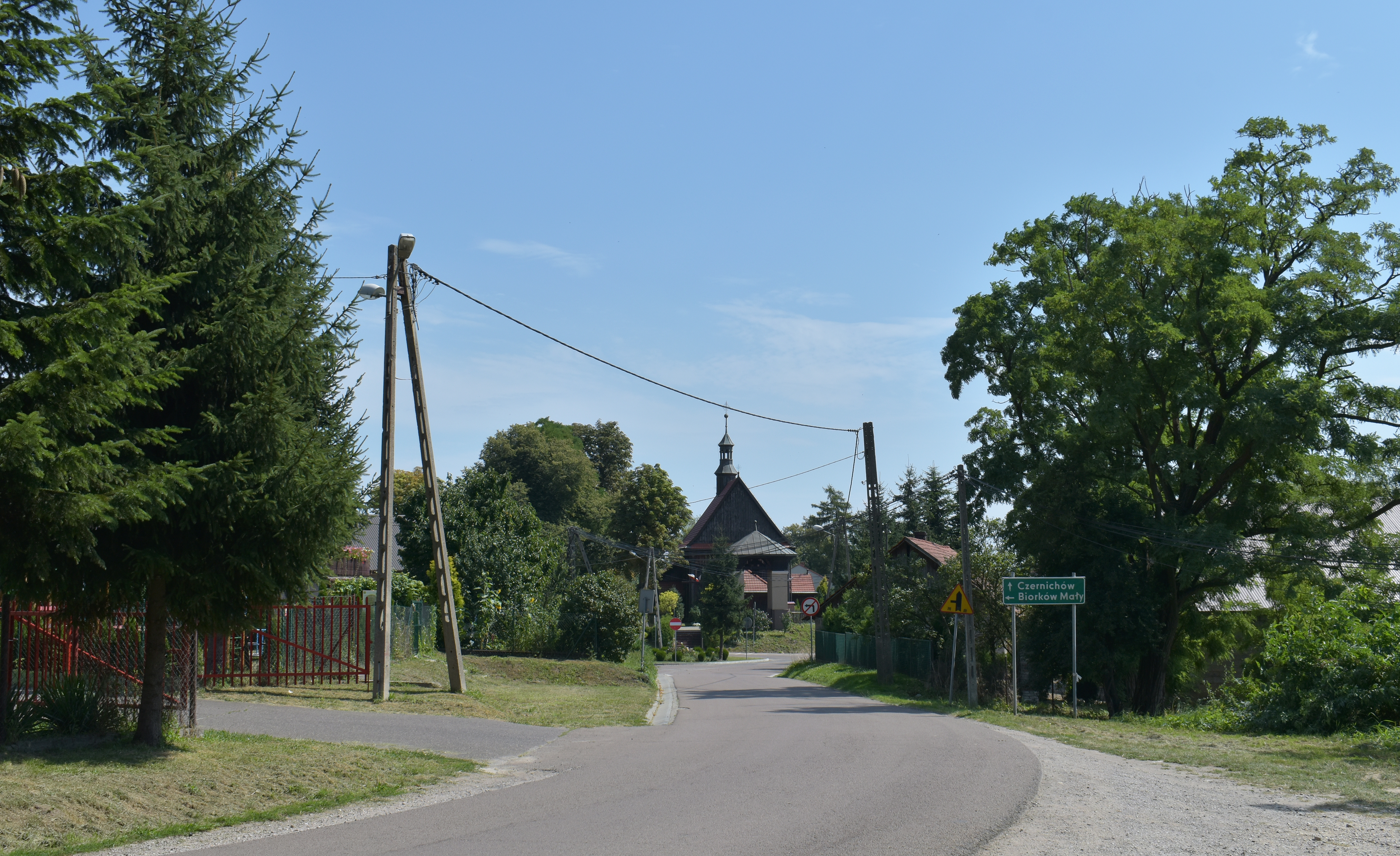

- Location within Poland
- Coordinates: 50°8′N 20°11′E
- Country: Poland
- Voivodeship: Lesser Poland
- County: Kraków
- Gmina: Kocmyrzów-Luborzyca

Czulice [t͡ʂuˈlit͡sɛ] is a village in the administrative district of Gmina Kocmyrzów-Luborzyca, within Kraków County, Lesser Poland Voivodeship, in southern Poland. The village is located in the historical region Galicia.
