= Goszcza =

- Village
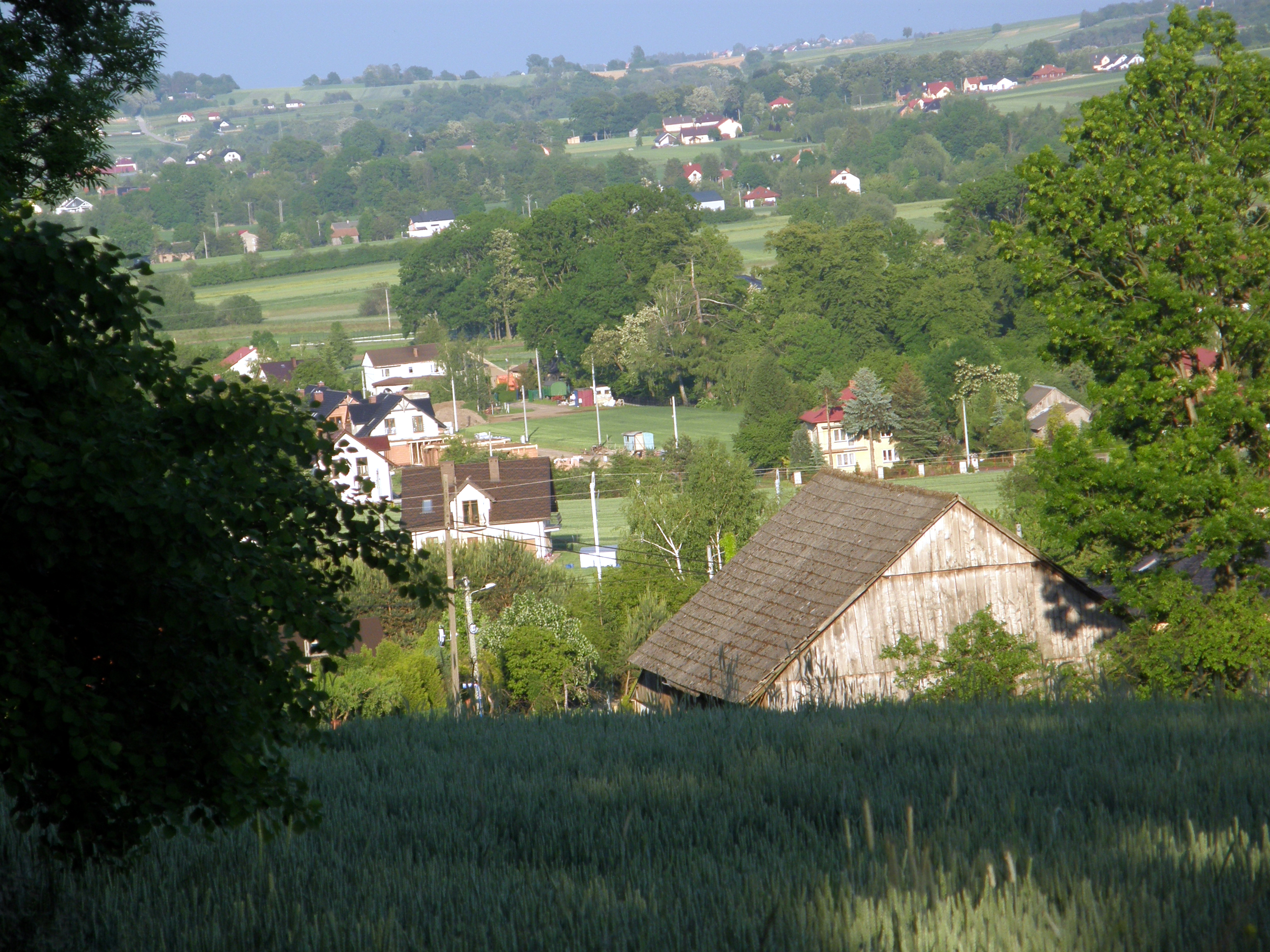

- Location within Poland
- Coordinates: 50°11′15″N 20°4′1″E
- Country: Poland
- Voivodeship: Lesser Poland
- County: Kraków
- Gmina: Kocmyrzów-Luborzyca
- Population (approx.): 470

Goszcza [ˈɡɔʂt͡ʂa] is a village in the administrative district of Gmina Kocmyrzów-Luborzyca, within Kraków County, Lesser Poland Voivodeship, in southern Poland.

The village has an approximate population of 470.
