= Sadowie, Lesser Poland Voivodeship =

Sadowie
- Village
- Location within Poland
- Coordinates: 50°10′50″N 20°3′54″E
- Country: Poland
- Voivodeship: Lesser Poland
- County: Kraków
- Gmina: Kocmyrzów-Luborzyca

Sadowie [saˈdɔvjɛ] is a village in the administrative district of Gmina Kocmyrzów-Luborzyca, within Kraków County, Lesser Poland Voivodeship, in southern Poland.
