= Luborzyca =

- Village
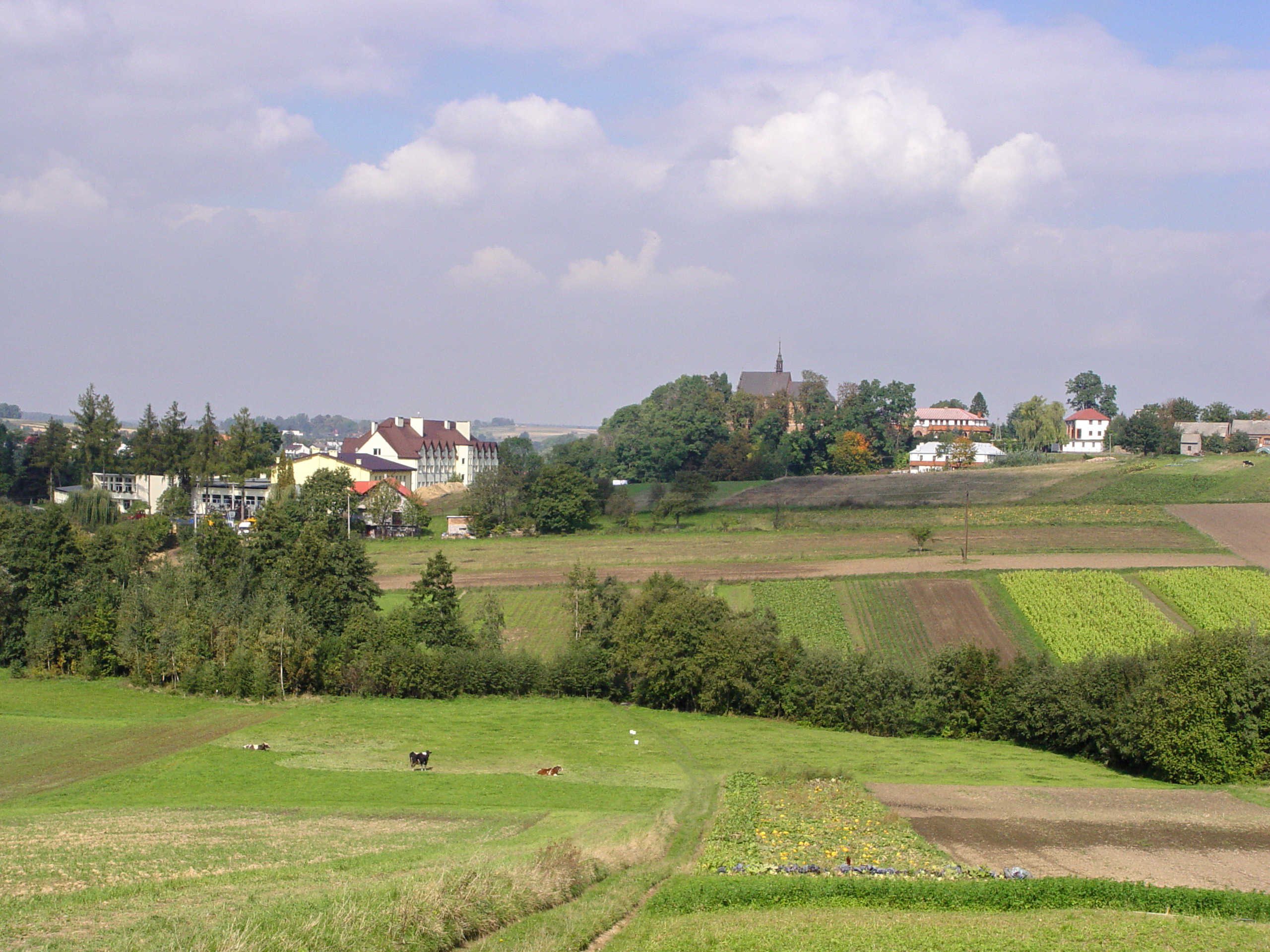
- Luborzyca

- Location within Poland
- Coordinates: 50°8′12″N 20°6′52″E
- Country: Poland
- Voivodeship: Lesser Poland
- County: Kraków
- Gmina: Kocmyrzów-Luborzyca
- Population: 590

Supposed flag used in the village from 1865 to 1945. It is unproven whether it was an official village flag or if it has ever been used.

Luborzyca [lubɔˈʐɨt͡sa] is a village in Kraków County, Lesser Poland Voivodeship, in southern Poland. It is the seat of the gmina (administrative district) called Gmina Kocmyrzów-Luborzyca.
