= Rawałowice =

- Village
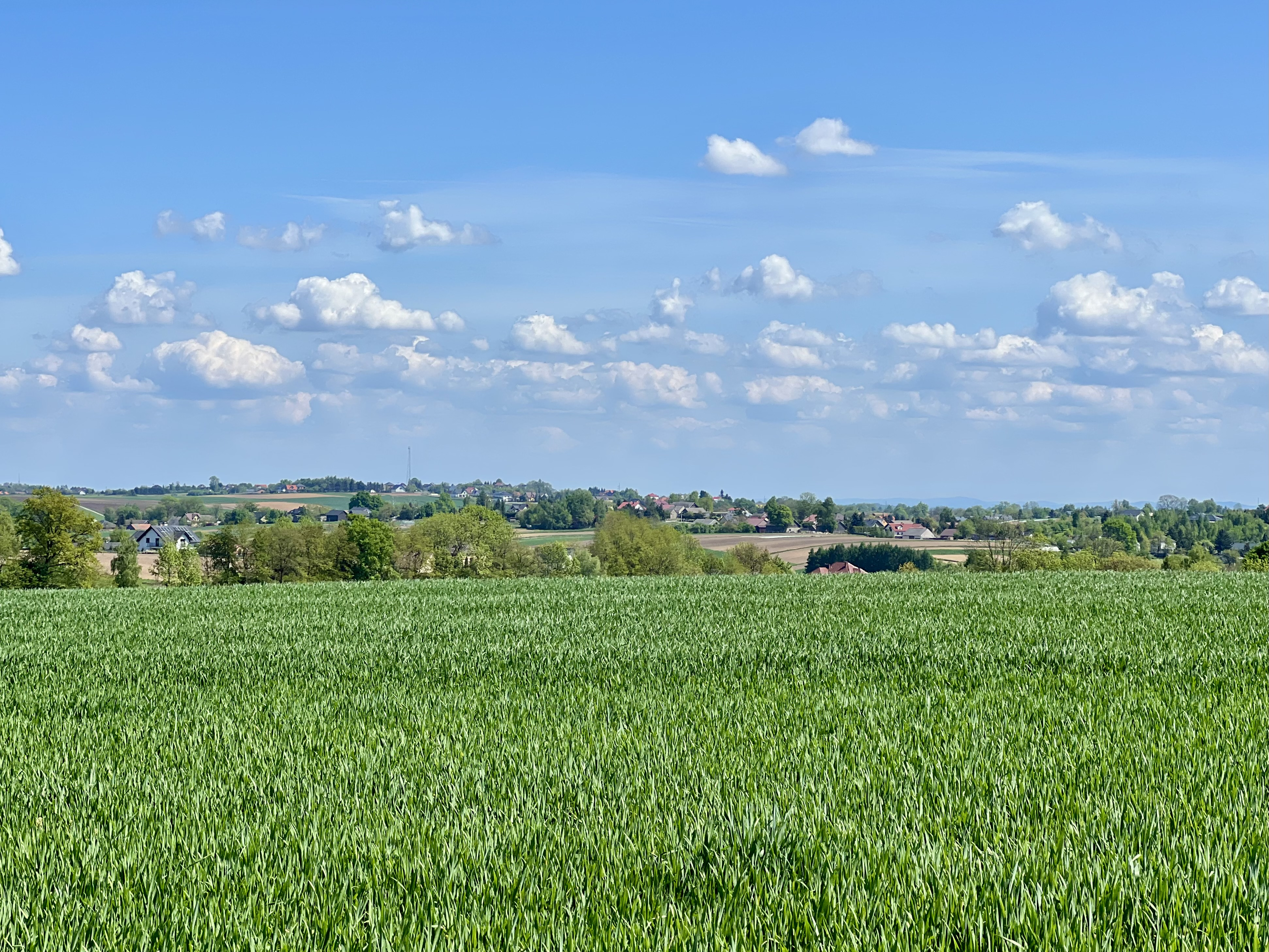

- Location within Poland
- Coordinates: 50°10′1″N 20°9′23″E
- Country: Poland
- Voivodeship: Lesser Poland
- County: Kraków
- Gmina: Kocmyrzów-Luborzyca

Rawałowice [ravawɔˈvit͡sɛ] is a village in the administrative district of Gmina Kocmyrzów-Luborzyca, within Kraków County, Lesser Poland Voivodeship, in southern Poland.
