= Wysiółek Luborzycki =

- Village
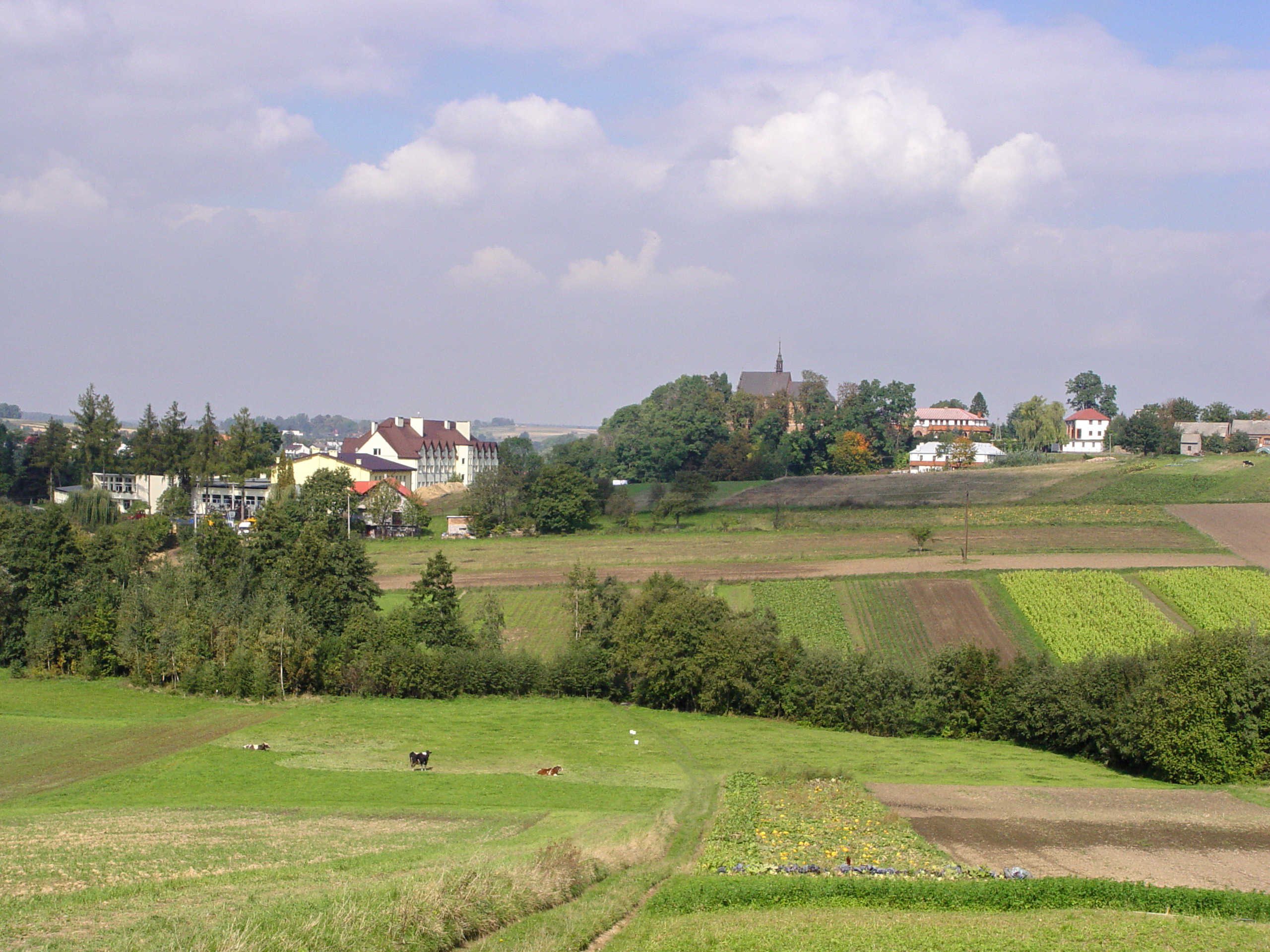

- Location within Poland
- Coordinates: 50°9′N 20°8′E
- Country: Poland
- Voivodeship: Lesser Poland
- County: Kraków
- Gmina: Kocmyrzów-Luborzyca

Wysiółek Luborzycki [vɨˈɕuwɛk lubɔˈʐɨt͡ski] is a village in the administrative district of Gmina Kocmyrzów-Luborzyca, within Kraków County, Lesser Poland Voivodeship, in southern Poland.
