= Łososkowice =

- Village
- Location within Poland
- Coordinates: 50°11′N 20°9′E
- Country: Poland
- Voivodeship: Lesser Poland
- County: Kraków
- Gmina: Kocmyrzów-Luborzyca

Łososkowice [wɔsɔskɔˈvit͡sɛ] is a village in the administrative district of Gmina Kocmyrzów-Luborzyca, within Kraków County, Lesser Poland Voivodeship, in southern Poland.
