= Prusy, Lesser Poland Voivodeship =

Prusy
- Village
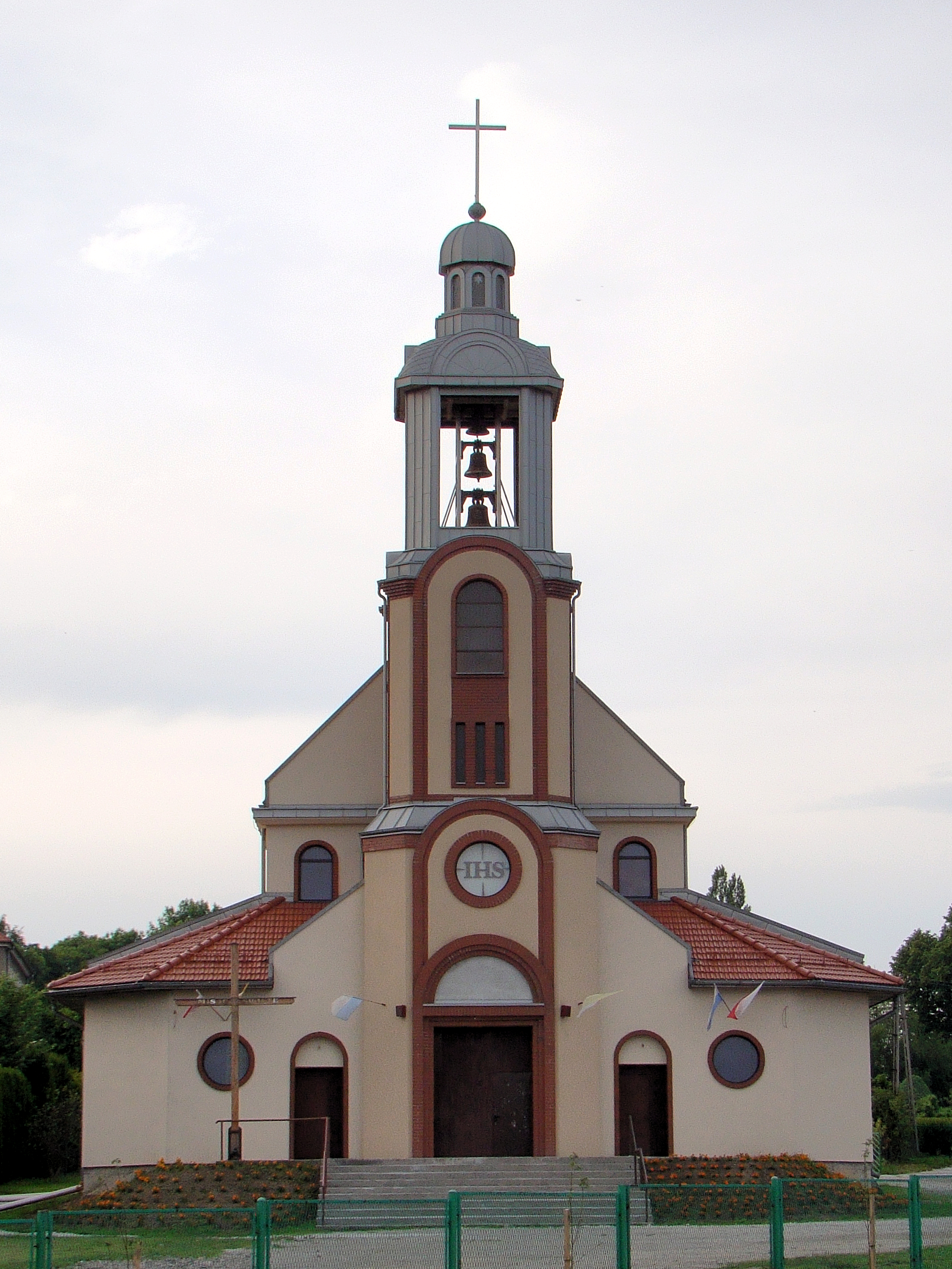
- Saint Mary Help of Christians church in Prusy

- Location within Poland
- Coordinates: 50°6′52″N 20°4′23″E
- Country: Poland
- Voivodeship: Lesser Poland
- County: Kraków
- Gmina: Kocmyrzów-Luborzyca

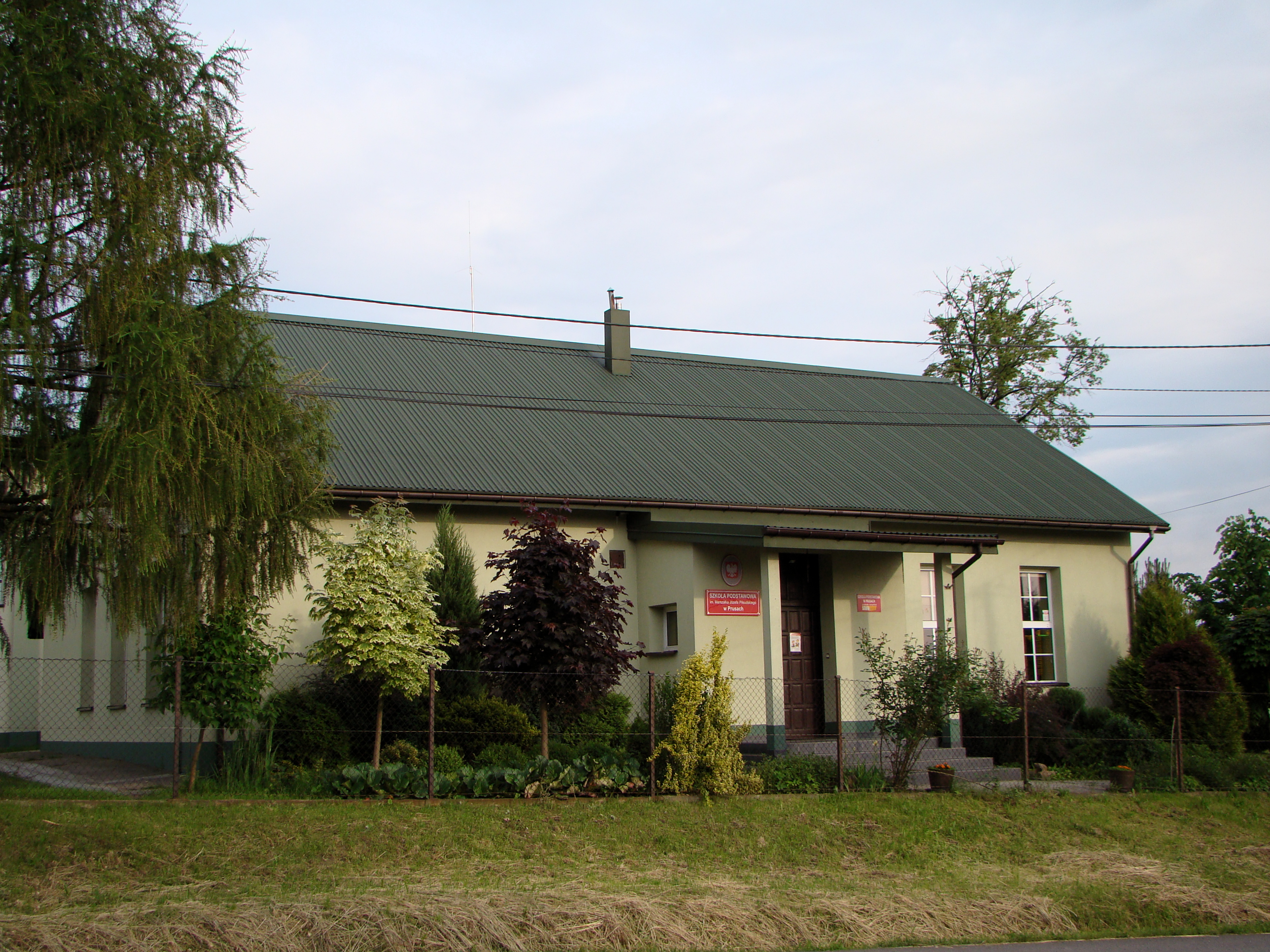
Elementary school

Prusy [ˈprusɨ] is a village in the administrative district of Gmina Kocmyrzów-Luborzyca, within Kraków County, Lesser Poland Voivodeship, in southern Poland.
