= Kocmyrzów =

- Village
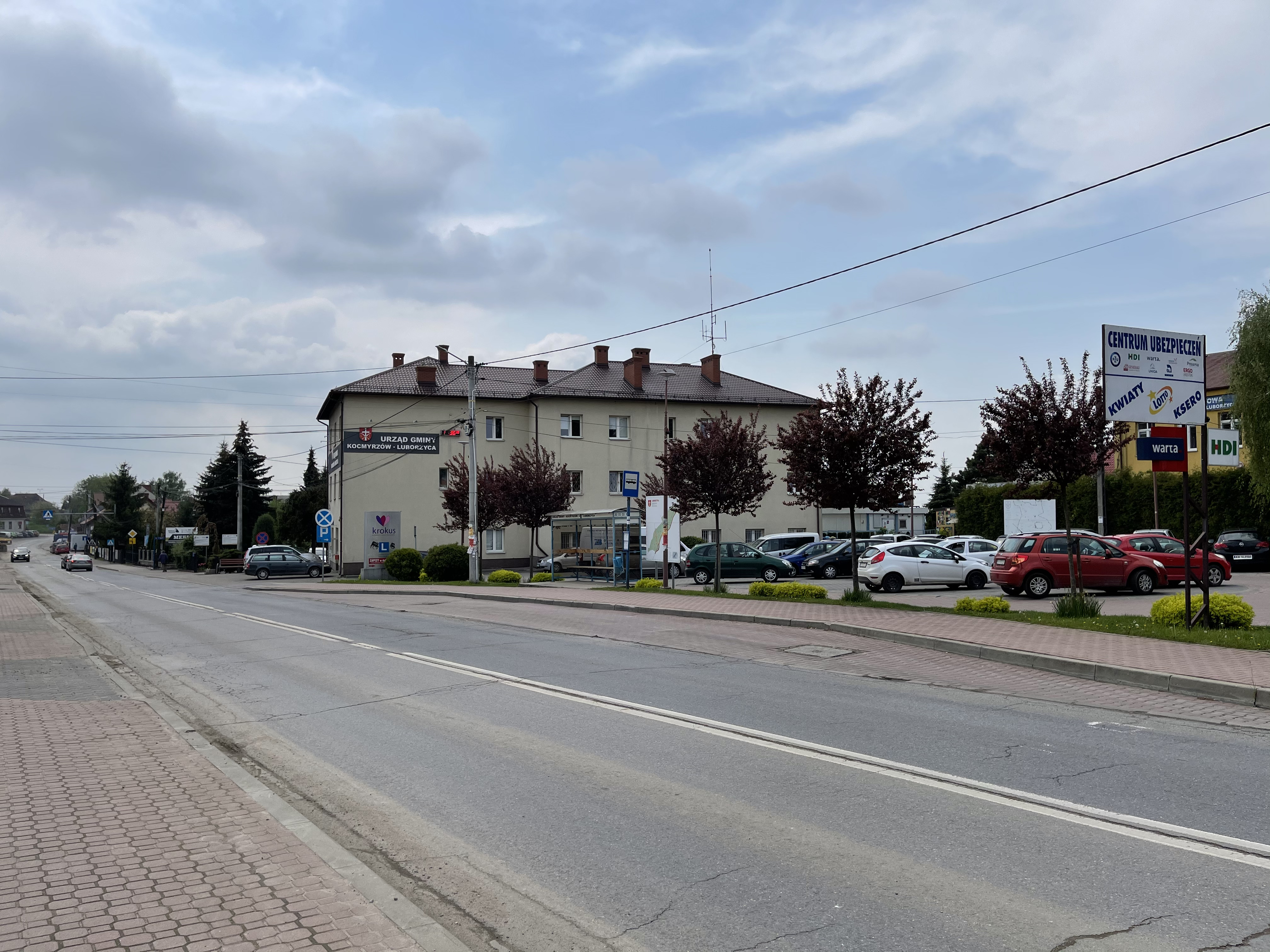

- Location within Poland
- Coordinates: 50°7′44″N 20°7′43″E
- Country: Poland
- Voivodeship: Lesser Poland
- County: Kraków
- Gmina: Kocmyrzów-Luborzyca
- Population (approx.): 700

Kocmyrzów [kɔt͡sˈmɨʐuf] is a village in the administrative district of Gmina Kocmyrzów-Luborzyca, within Kraków County, Lesser Poland Voivodeship, in southern Poland.

The village has an approximate population of 700.

== History ==
As a result of the Partitions of Poland (1772–1795), the Galicia area and Kraków were attributed to the Habsburg Monarchy. Kocmyrzów was in the Bezirkshauptmannschaft (powiat?) of Kraków area when the post-office was opened in Austrian Galicia in 1878.

For more details, see the article Kingdom of Galicia and Lodomeria.

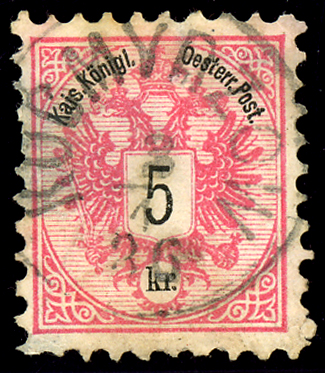
Austria KK 5 kreuzer stamp, cancelled at KOCMYRZOW in 1886
