= Baranivka =

Baranivka is the name of several populated places (including at least eight villages) in Ukraine:

- Baranivka, Zhytomyr Oblast, a city
- Baranivka, Myrhorod Raion, Poltava Oblast, a village
- Baranivka, Ternopil Oblast, a village
- Baranivka, Kharkiv Oblast, a village
- Baranivka Raion, a former raion in Zhytomyr Oblast

== See also ==
- Baranovka (disambiguation)
