= Wola Luborzycka =

- Village
- Location within Poland
- Coordinates: 50°10′N 20°7′E
- Country: Poland
- Voivodeship: Lesser Poland
- County: Kraków
- Gmina: Kocmyrzów-Luborzyca

Wola Luborzycka [ˈvɔla lubɔˈʐɨt͡ska] is a village in the administrative district of Gmina Kocmyrzów-Luborzyca, within Kraków County, Lesser Poland Voivodeship, in southern Poland.
