= Dojazdów =

- Village
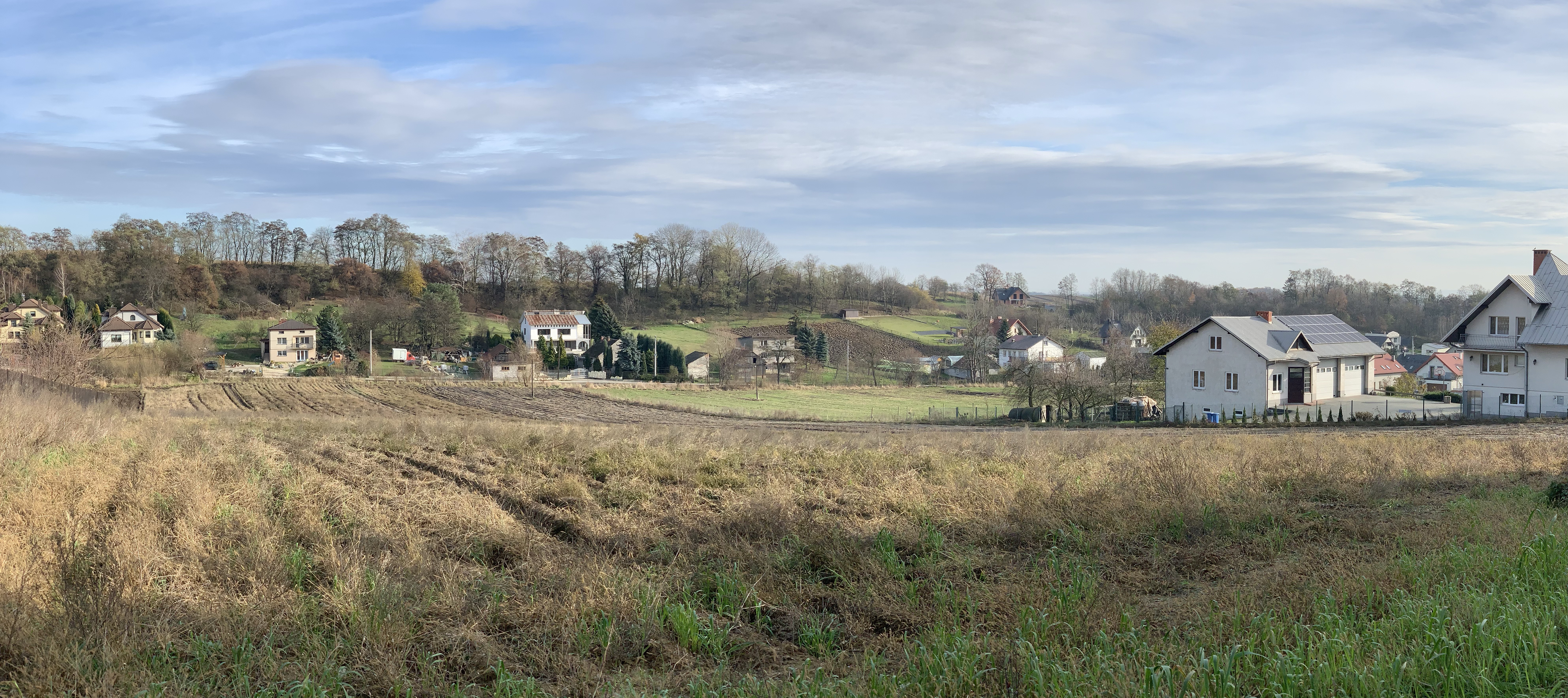

- Location within Poland
- Coordinates: 50°7′N 20°7′E
- Country: Poland
- Voivodeship: Lesser Poland
- County: Kraków
- Gmina: Kocmyrzów-Luborzyca

Dojazdów [dɔˈjazduf] is a village in the administrative district of Gmina Kocmyrzów-Luborzyca, within Kraków County, Lesser Poland Voivodeship, in southern Poland.
