= Gmina Kocmyrzów-Luborzyca =

Gmina Kocmyrzów-Luborzyca Kocmyrzów-Luborzyca Commune
- Gmina
- Flag Coat of arms
- Interactive map of Gmina Kocmyrzów-Luborzyca
- Coordinates (Luborzyca): 50°8′12″N 20°6′52″E
- Country: Poland
- Voivodeship: Lesser Poland
- County: Kraków County
- Seat: Luborzyca

Area
  - Total: 82.53 km^{2} (31.87 sq mi)

Population (2006)
  - Total: 13,199
  - Density: 159.9/km^{2} (414.2/sq mi)
- Website: http://www.kocmyrzow-luborzyca.ug.gov.pl/

Gmina Kocmyrzów-Luborzyca is a rural gmina (administrative district) in Kraków County, Lesser Poland Voivodeship, in southern Poland. Its seat is the village of Luborzyca, which lies approximately 16 kilometres (10 mi) north-east of the regional capital Kraków.

The gmina covers an area of 82.53 square kilometres (31.9 sq mi), and as of 2006 its total population is 13,199.

== Villages ==
Gmina Kocmyrzów-Luborzyca contains the villages and settlements of Baranówka, Czulice, Dojazdów, Głęboka, Goszcza, Goszyce, Kocmyrzów, Krzysztoforzyce, Łososkowice, Luborzyca, Łuczyce, Maciejowice, Marszowice, Pietrzejowice, Prusy, Rawałowice, Sadowie, Skrzeszowice, Sulechów, Wiktorowice, Wilków, Wola Luborzycka, Wysiółek Luborzycki and Zastów.

== Neighbouring gminas ==
Gmina Kocmyrzów-Luborzyca is bordered by the city of Kraków and by the gminas of Igołomia-Wawrzeńczyce, Iwanowice, Koniusza, Michałowice and Słomniki.
