= Wilków, Lesser Poland Voivodeship =

Wilków
- Village
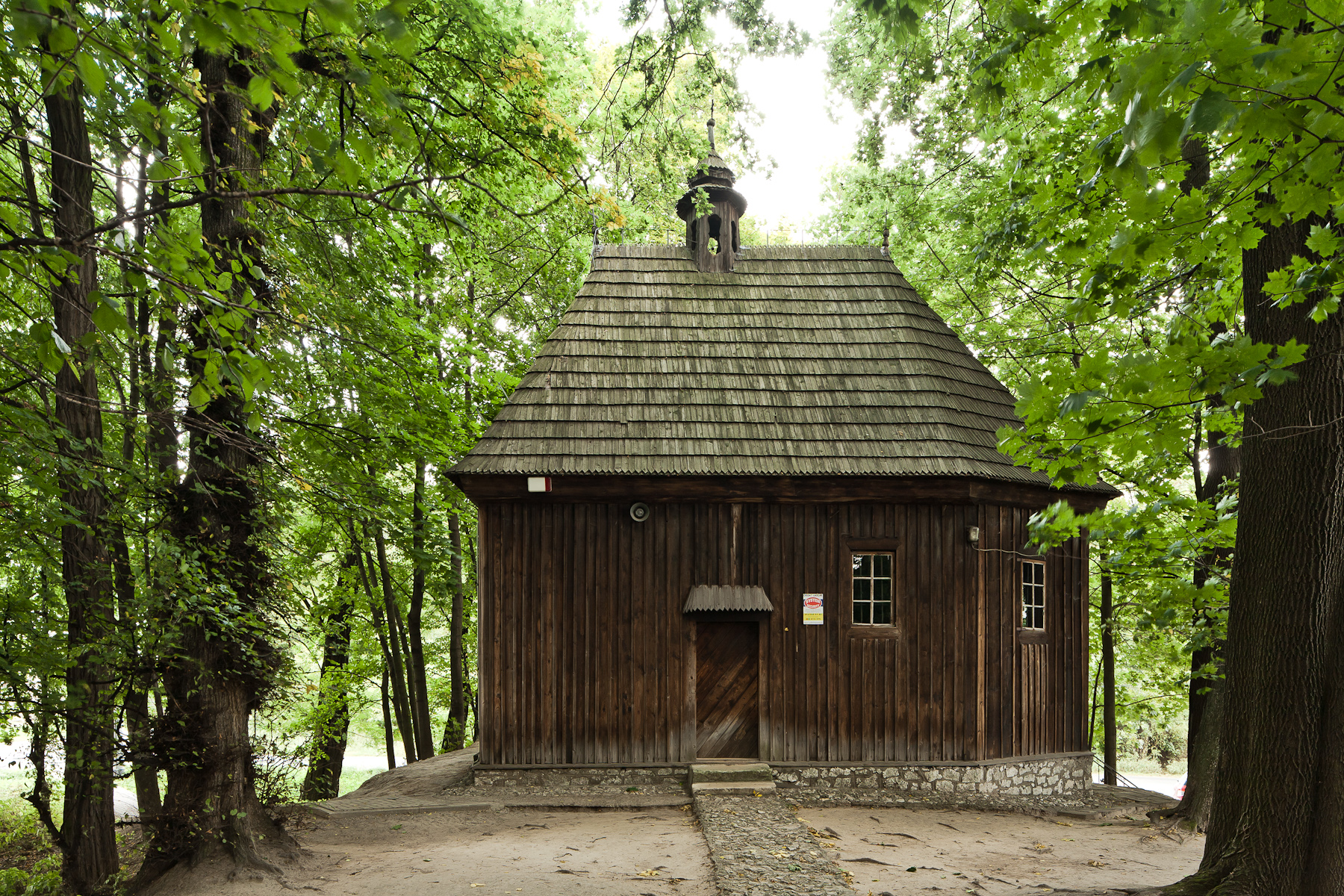
- Chapel

- Location within Poland
- Coordinates: 50°10′49″N 20°6′35″E
- Country: Poland
- Voivodeship: Lesser Poland
- County: Kraków
- Gmina: Kocmyrzów-Luborzyca

Wilków [ˈvilkuf] is a village in the administrative district of Gmina Kocmyrzów-Luborzyca, within Kraków County, Lesser Poland Voivodeship, in southern Poland.
