= Maciejowice, Lesser Poland Voivodeship =

Maciejowice
- Village
- Location within Poland
- Coordinates: 50°8′26″N 20°4′26″E
- Country: Poland
- Voivodeship: Lesser Poland
- County: Kraków
- Gmina: Kocmyrzów-Luborzyca

Maciejowice [mat͡ɕɛjɔˈvit͡sɛ] is a village in the administrative district of Gmina Kocmyrzów-Luborzyca, within Kraków County, Lesser Poland Voivodeship, in southern Poland.
