= Sulechów, Lesser Poland Voivodeship =

Sulechów
- Village
- Location within Poland
- Coordinates: 50°7′35″N 20°6′3″E
- Country: Poland
- Voivodeship: Lesser Poland
- County: Kraków
- Gmina: Kocmyrzów-Luborzyca
- Time zone: UTC+1 (CET)
  - Summer (DST): UTC+2 (CEST)
- Vehicle registration: KRA
- Primary airport: Kraków John Paul II International Airport

Sulechów [suˈlɛxuf] is a village in the administrative district of Gmina Kocmyrzów-Luborzyca, within Kraków County, Lesser Poland Voivodeship, in southern Poland. The village is located in the historical region of Lesser Poland.
