= Skrzeszowice =

- Village
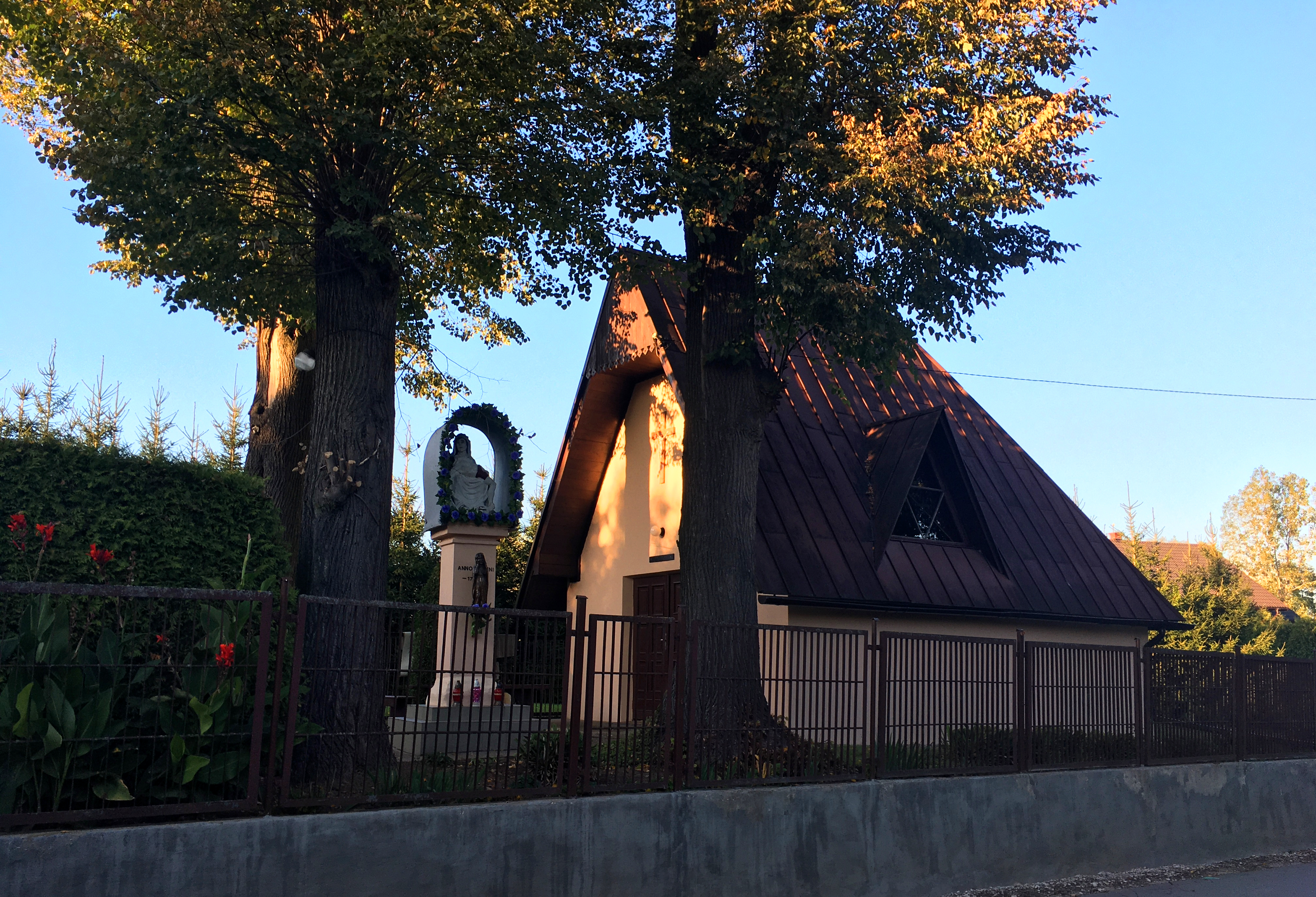
- Chapel

- Location within Poland
- Coordinates: 50°12′N 20°9′E
- Country: Poland
- Voivodeship: Lesser Poland
- County: Kraków
- Gmina: Kocmyrzów-Luborzyca

Skrzeszowice [skʂɛʂɔˈvit͡sɛ] is a village in the administrative district of Gmina Kocmyrzów-Luborzyca, within Kraków County, Lesser Poland Voivodeship, in southern Poland.
