= Wiktorowice =

- Village
- Location within Poland
- Coordinates: 50°8′20″N 20°3′32″E
- Country: Poland
- Voivodeship: Lesser Poland
- County: Kraków
- Gmina: Kocmyrzów-Luborzyca

Wiktorowice [viktɔrɔˈvit͡sɛ] is a village in the administrative district of Gmina Kocmyrzów-Luborzyca, within Kraków County, Lesser Poland Voivodeship, in southern Poland.
