= Baranovka, Kamyshinsky District, Volgograd Oblast =

Baranovka Барановка
- Selo
- Location within Volgograd Oblast Location within Russia
- Coordinates: 50°07′N 45°09′E
- Country: Russia
- Region: Volgograd Oblast
- District: Kamyshinsky District
- Time zone: UTC+4:00

Baranovka (Russian: Барановка) is a rural locality (a selo) in Petruninskoye Rural Settlement, Kamyshinsky District, Volgograd Oblast, Russia. The population was 466 as of 2010. There are 11 streets.

== Geography ==
Baranovka is located on the Volga Upland, on the Ilovlya River, 26 km northwest of Kamyshin (the district's administrative centre) by road. Petrov Val is the nearest rural locality.
