= Łuczyce, Lesser Poland Voivodeship =

Łuczyce
- Village
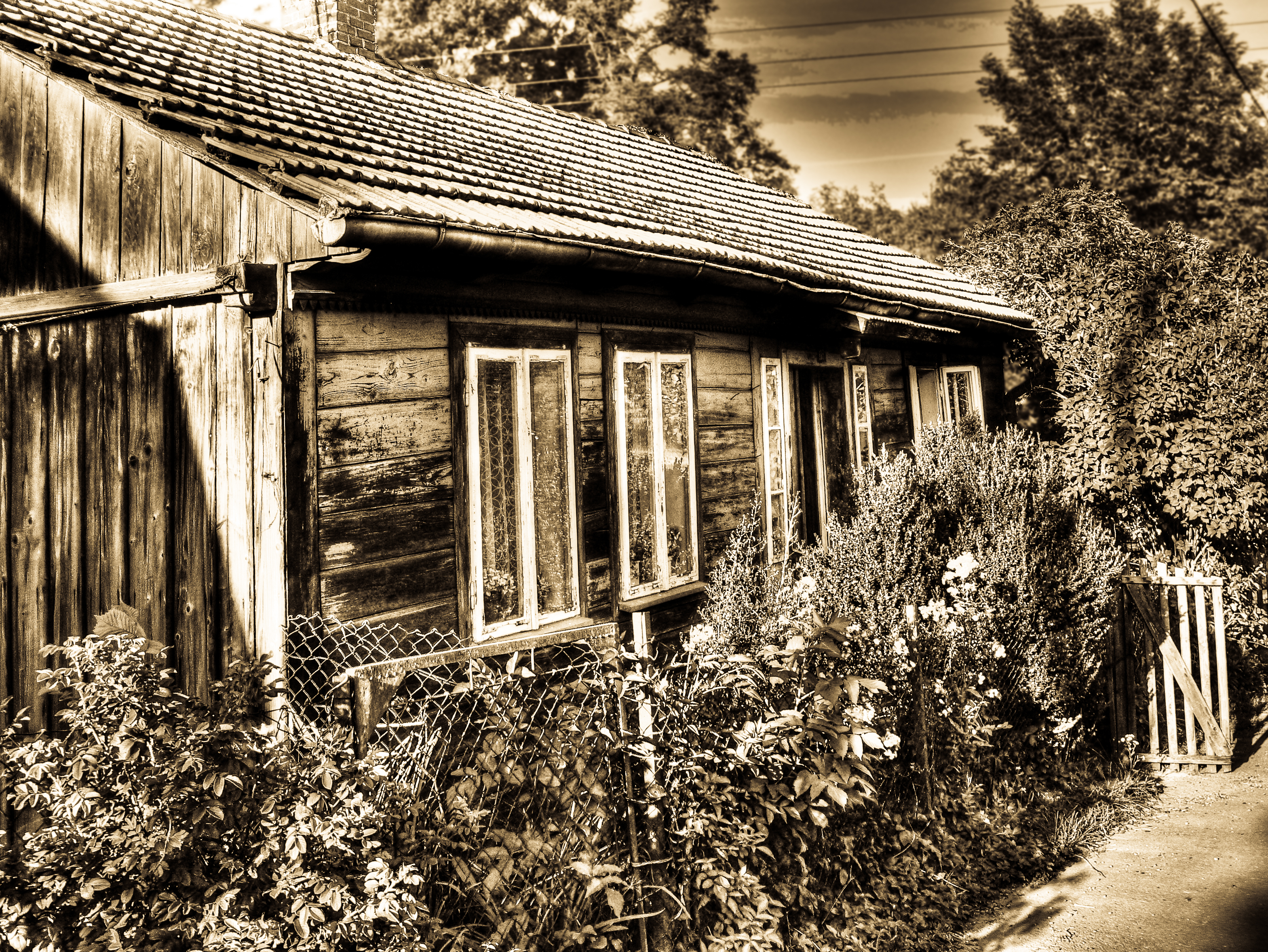
- Wooden house

- Location within Poland
- Coordinates: 50°9′52″N 20°4′8″E
- Country: Poland
- Voivodeship: Lesser Poland
- County: Kraków
- Gmina: Kocmyrzów-Luborzyca

Łuczyce [wuˈt͡ʂɨt͡sɛ] is a village in the administrative district of Gmina Kocmyrzów-Luborzyca, within Kraków County, Lesser Poland Voivodeship, in southern Poland.
