= Marszowice, Kraków County =

Marszowice
- Village
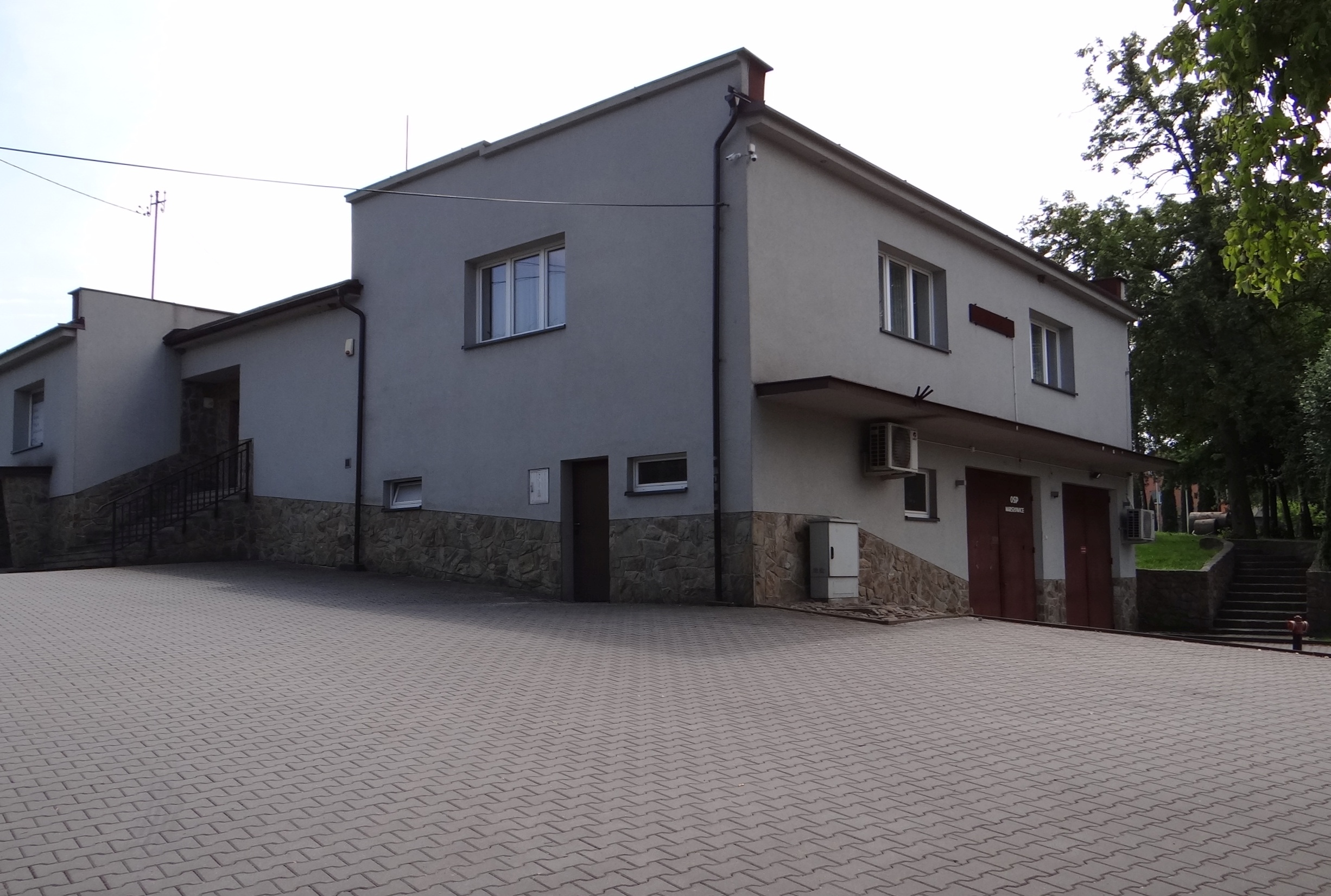
- Volunteer fire department in Marszowice

- Location within Poland
- Coordinates: 50°10′54″N 20°4′38″E
- Country: Poland
- Voivodeship: Lesser Poland
- County: Kraków
- Gmina: Kocmyrzów-Luborzyca
- Time zone: UTC+1 (CET)
  - Summer (DST): UTC+2 (CEST)
- Vehicle registration: KRA

Marszowice [marʂɔˈvit͡sɛ] is a village in the administrative district of Gmina Kocmyrzów-Luborzyca, within Kraków County, Lesser Poland Voivodeship, in southern Poland.
