= Baranovka, Narimanovsky District, Astrakhan Oblast =

Baranovka Барановка
- Selo
- Location within Astrakhan Oblast Location within Russia
- Coordinates: 46°47′N 47°47′E
- Country: Russia
- Region: Astrakhan Oblast
- District: Narimanovsky District
- Time zone: UTC+4:00

Baranovka (Russian: Барановка) is a rural locality (a selo) and the administrative center of Baranovsky Selsoviet, Narimanovsky District, Astrakhan Oblast, Russia. The population was 676 as of 2010. There are 10 streets.

== Geography ==
Baranovka is located 16 km north of Narimanov (the district's administrative centre) by road. Petropavlovka is the nearest rural locality.
