= Krzysztoforzyce =

- Village
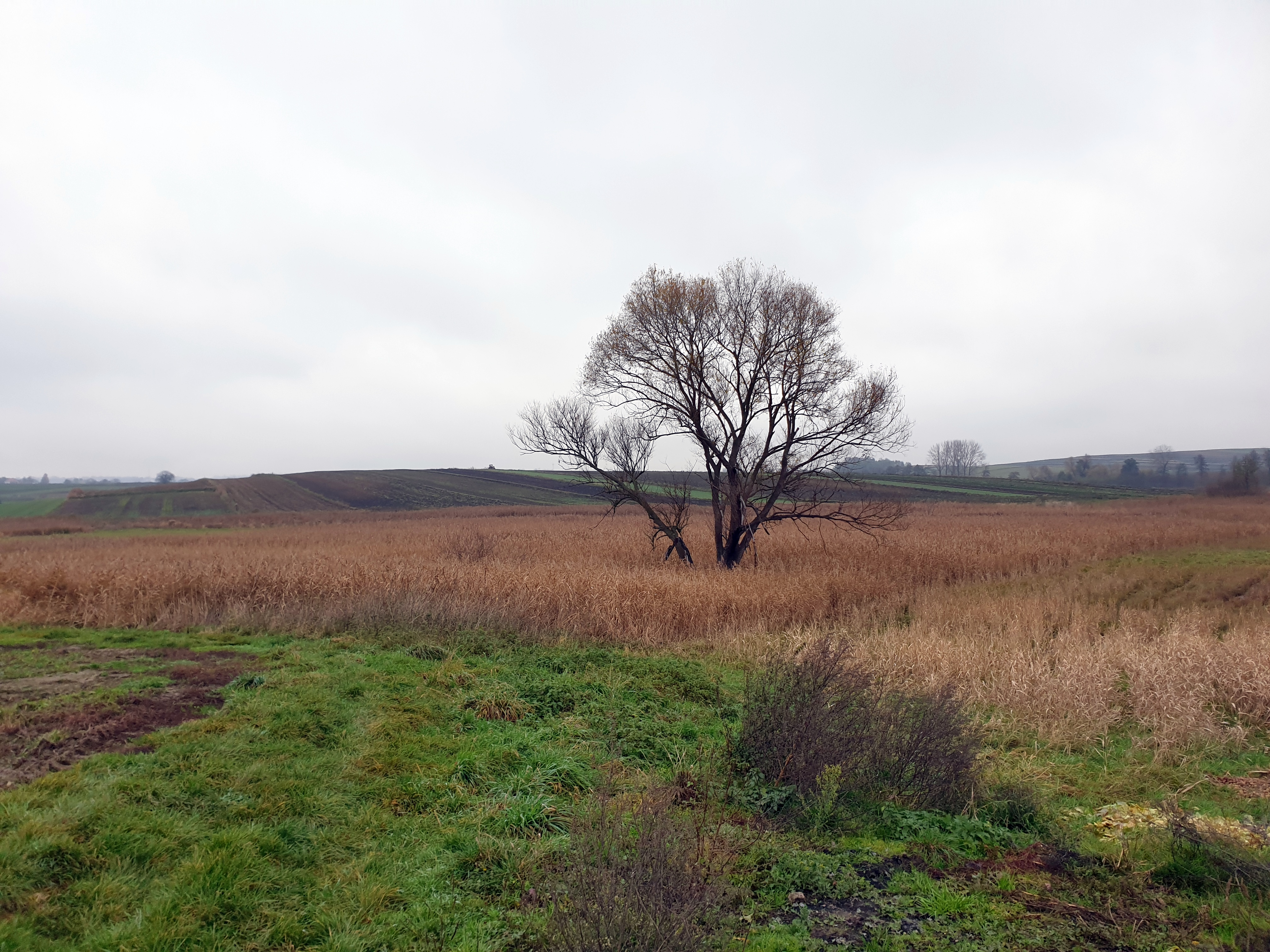

- Location within Poland
- Coordinates: 50°6′53″N 20°7′50″E
- Country: Poland
- Voivodeship: Lesser Poland
- County: Kraków
- Gmina: Kocmyrzów-Luborzyca

Krzysztoforzyce [kʂɨʂtɔfɔˈʐɨt͡sɛ] is a village in the administrative district of Gmina Kocmyrzów-Luborzyca, within Kraków County, Lesser Poland Voivodeship, in southern Poland.
