= Baranovka, Vladimir Oblast =

Baranovka Барановка
- Village
- Location within Vladimir Oblast Location within Russia
- Coordinates: 56°11′N 39°37′E
- Country: Russia
- Region: Vladimir Oblast
- District: Kolchuginsky District
- Time zone: UTC+3:00

Baranovka (Russian: Барановка) is a rural locality (a village) in Razdolyevskoye Rural Settlement, Kolchuginsky District, Vladimir Oblast, Russia. The population was 7 as of 2010.

== Geography ==
Baranovka is located 22 km southeast of Kolchugino (the district's administrative centre) by road. Yeltsino is the nearest rural locality.
