= Baranovka, Altai Krai =

Baranovka Барановка
- Selo
- Location within Altai Krai Location within Russia
- Coordinates: 51°03′N 82°12′E
- Country: Russia
- Region: Altai Krai
- District: Zmeinogorsky District
- Time zone: UTC+7:00

Baranovka (Russian: Барановка) is a rural locality (a selo) and the administrative center of Baranovsky Selsoviet, Zmeinogorsky District, Altai Krai, Russia. The population was 1,917 as of 2013. There are 10 streets.

== Geography ==
Baranovka is located 13 km south of Zmeinogorsk (the district's administrative centre) by road. Galtsovka is the nearest rural locality.
