= Baranovka, Chernoyarsky District, Astrakhan Oblast =

Baranovka Барановка
- Selo
- Location within Astrakhan Oblast Location within Russia
- Coordinates: 48°07′N 46°04′E
- Country: Russia
- Region: Astrakhan Oblast
- District: Chernoyarsky District
- Time zone: UTC+4:00

Baranovka (Russian: Барановка) is a rural locality (a selo) in Chernoyarsky Selsoviet, Chernoyarsky District, Astrakhan Oblast, Russia. The population was 28 as of 2010.

== Geography ==
Baranovka is located 11 km north of Chyorny Yar (the district's administrative centre) by road. Zubovka is the nearest rural locality.
