= Baranovka, Krasnoyarsky District, Astrakhan Oblast =

Baranovka Барановка
- Settlement
- Location within Astrakhan Oblast Location within Russia
- Coordinates: 46°33′N 48°20′E
- Country: Russia
- Region: Astrakhan Oblast
- District: Krasnoyarsky District
- Time zone: UTC+4:00

Baranovka (Russian: Барановка) is a rural locality (a settlement) in Baybeksky Selsoviet, Krasnoyarsky District, Astrakhan Oblast, Russia. The population was 41 as of 2010. There is 1 street.

== Geography ==
Baranovka is located 3 km north of Krasny Yar (the district's administrative centre) by road. Mayachnoye is the nearest rural locality.
