= Baranówka, Lesser Poland Voivodeship =

Baranówka
- Village
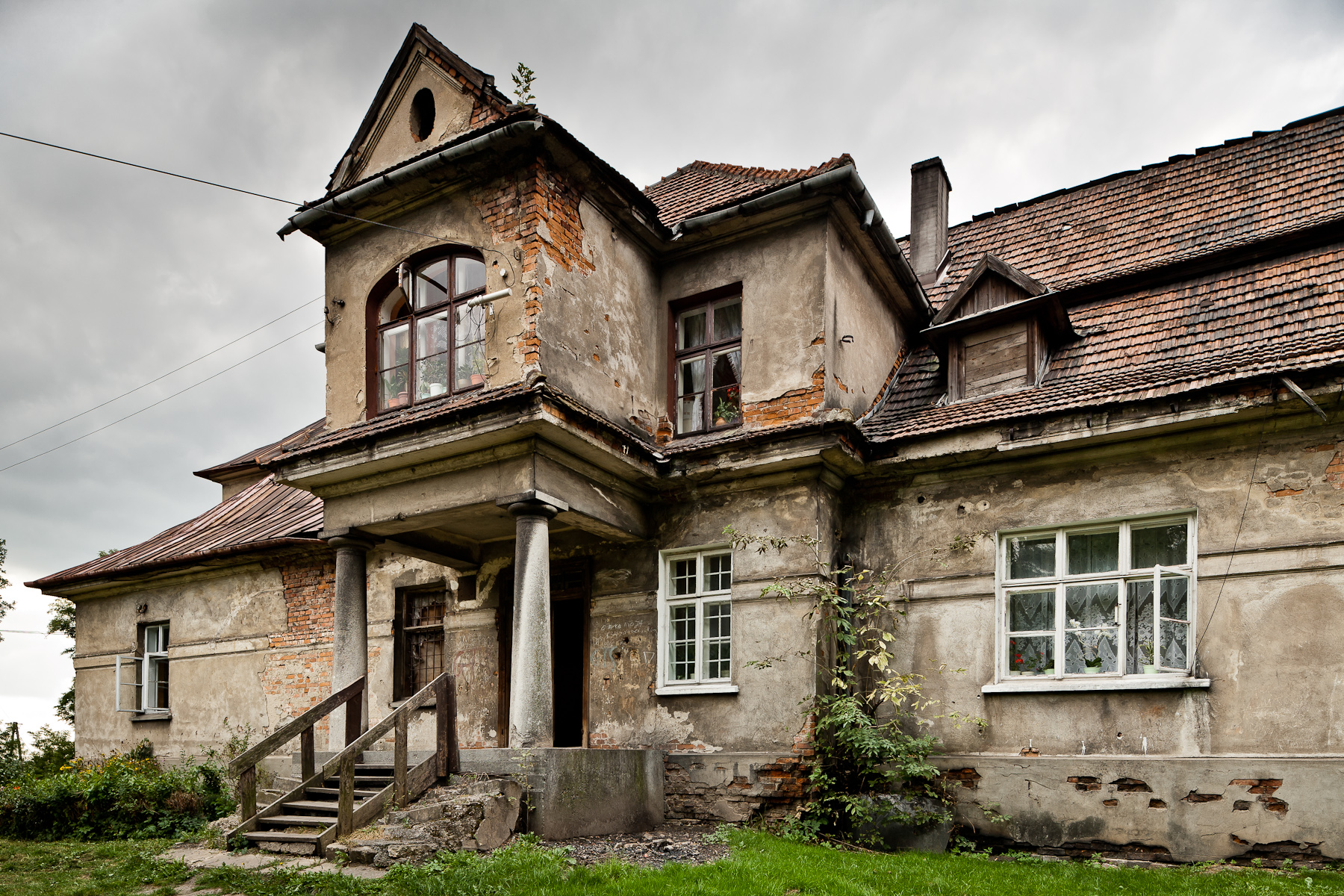
- Manor house

- Location within Poland
- Coordinates: 50°7′55″N 20°3′31″E
- Country: Poland
- Voivodeship: Lesser Poland
- County: Kraków
- Gmina: Kocmyrzów-Luborzyca
- Population: 750

Baranówka [baraˈnufka] is a village in the administrative district of Gmina Kocmyrzów-Luborzyca, within Kraków County, Lesser Poland Voivodeship, in southern Poland.
