= Baranovka, Volodarsky District, Astrakhan Oblast =

Baranovka Барановка
- Selo
- Location within Astrakhan Oblast Location within Russia
- Coordinates: 46°22′N 48°43′E
- Country: Russia
- Region: Astrakhan Oblast
- District: Volodarsky District
- Time zone: UTC+4:00

Baranovka (Russian: Барановка) is a rural locality (a selo) in Kalininsky Selsoviet of Volodarsky District, Astrakhan Oblast, Russia. The population was 193 as of 2010. There is 1 street.

== Geography ==
Baranovka is located 20 km (12 mi) southeast of Volodarsky (the district's administrative centre) by road. Lebyazhye is the nearest rural locality.
