= Baranivka, Kharkiv Oblast =

Village in Kharkiv Oblast, Ukraine

Baranivka Баранівка
- Village
- Location within Kharkiv Oblast Location within Ukraine Location within Europe
- Coordinates: 50.379216°N 35.966964°E
- Country: Ukraine
- Oblast: Kharkiv Oblast
- Raion: Bohodukhiv Raion
- Hromada: Zolochiv settlement hromada
- Established: c. 1650

Population (2026)
  - Total: 47
- Postal code: 62213

Baranivka (Ukrainian: Баранівка) is a village located in Bohodukhiv Raion, Kharkiv Oblast, Ukraine. It belongs to the Zolochiv settlement hromada, one of the hromadas (communities) of Ukraine.

== History ==
Baranivka was probably founded around the year 1650.

In October 2017, as part of Ukraine's decentralization reforms, Ukraine established the Zolochiv settlement hromada. In total, 77 populated places were integrated into the hromada, including Baranivka.

The population of the village in 2020 was around 300 residents. Still, after Russia's full-scale invasion of Ukraine, the village was struck by multiple drone strikes and artillery shelling, leading to the population declining to around 47 people as of July 1st 2024.

On June 29 and 30, 2024, due to heavy Russian artillery barrages, the village's electricity went out. Prior to this, on the 25th of June, it was reported that Russian mortars destroyed 2 houses and disrupted power lines.

On October 19, 2025, it was reported that a 35-year-old man died and 3 men aged 31, 33 and 49 were injured in Baranivka after multiple Russian strikes on the Kharkiv Oblast. The strikes involved the use of 10 guided bombs, three FPV drones, and 1 unidentified UAV.

On December 15, 2025, it was reported that guided bombs were used by Russia in a strike on the Kharkiv Oblast. They hit multiple villages, including Baranivka, however, no casualties nor hits on residential housing or infrastructure occurred.

== Location ==
Baranivka is located on the right bank of the Udy River. 4 kilometres upstream is the village of Udy. 1 kilometre downstream is the village of Andriivka.

== See also ==
- Russian occupation of Kharkiv Oblast
- 2022 Kharkiv counteroffensive
