= Głęboka, Kraków County =

Głęboka
- Village
- Location within Poland
- Coordinates: 50°8′2″N 20°8′54″E
- Country: Poland
- Voivodeship: Lesser Poland
- County: Kraków
- Gmina: Kocmyrzów-Luborzyca

Głęboka [ɡwɛmˈbɔka] is a village in the administrative district of Gmina Kocmyrzów-Luborzyca, within Kraków County, Lesser Poland Voivodeship, in southern Poland. The village is located in the historical region Galicia.
