= Gorgon (disambiguation) =

In Greek mythology, a Gorgon is one of three monstrous sisters (including Medusa) who turned people to stone.

The Gorgon is another name for Medusa.

Gorgon may also refer to:

== Entertainment ==
- Gorgon (composition), a composition for orchestra by Christopher Rouse
- Gorgon Video, a video production company and film distributor of dark documentaries and extreme horror films
- Gorgon (comics), two Marvel Comics and two DC Comics characters
- Delphyne Gorgon, a Marvel Comics character
- Archduke Gorgon, a character from the Mazinger series of manga and anime
- Gorgon (video game), a 1981 side-scrolling game for the Apple II
- The Gorgon, a 1964 British Horror film
- The Gorgon (1942 film), an Italian historical drama
- The Gargons, a species of giant extraterrestrial lobsters from Teenagers from Outer Space

== Military ==
- HMS Gorgon, several ships of the Royal Navy
- Gorgon-class monitor, a First World War Royal Navy monitor class
- Gorgon (U.S. missile), an American missile developed during World War II
- the SH-11 Russian anti-ballistic missile, formerly part of the A-135 anti-ballistic missile system
- Gorgon Stare, a United States military surveillance system

== Other uses ==
- Gorgon of Rhodes, ancient Greek historian
- Gorgon of Nicomedia, ancient Christian martyr
- Gorgon (surname)
- Euryale ferox, the "gorgon plant"
- Gorgon gas project, a resources project in Western Australia
- Gorgoń, Łódź Voivodeship, Poland
- South Devon Railway Gorgon class of locomotives
- An African Gorgon, a mythological creature also known as a Catoblepas
- Gorgon City, an English electronic music production duo

== See also ==
- Gorgan, a city in Iran
- Gorgone (disambiguation)
- Gorgonopsia, a sub-order of prehistoric mammal-like reptiles
- Meandrusa payeni or Yellow Gorgon, a butterfly
- Meandrusa sciron or Brown Gorgon, a butterfly
- Saint-Gorgon (disambiguation), several communes in France
