= Lazy =

Lazy is the adjective for laziness, a lack of desire to expend effort.

It may also refer to:

== Music ==
=== Groups and musicians ===
- Lazy (band), a Japanese rock band
- Lazy Lester, American blues harmonica player Leslie Johnson (1933–2018)
- Lazy Bill Lucas (1918–1982), American blues musician and singer
- Doug Lazy, stage name of American hip hop and dance music producer and DJ Gene Douglas Finley
- Lazy, an American band featuring former members of the Supreme Beings of Leisure

=== Albums ===
- Lazy (album), an album by The Hot Monkey

=== Songs ===
- "Lazy" (Deep Purple song), 1972
- "Lazy" (Irving Berlin song), 1924
- "Lazy" (Suede song), 1997
- "Lazy" (X-Press 2 song), 2002
- "Lazy", by Exo-CBX from Blooming Days
- "Lazy", by Love & Rockets from Earth, Sun, Moon
- "Lazy", by Parokya Ni Edgar from Gulong Itlog Gulong
- "Lazy", by The Vaccines and Kylie Minogue for A Shaun the Sheep Movie: Farmageddon, 2019

== Places ==
- Lazy (Orlová), a former village now part of the town of Orlová in the Czech Republic
- Lazy pod Makytou, a village and municipality in Slovakia
- Łazy (disambiguation), several towns and villages in Poland
- Lazy Branch, a stream in Missouri, United States

== See also ==
- Laizy, a French commune
