= Łazy (disambiguation) =

Łazy is a town in Silesian Voivodeship, southern Poland. The name is cultural in origin and commonly found in Slavic languages denoting an arable area obtained by slash-and-burn technique.

Łazy may also refer to the following places:

- Gmina Łazy in Silesian Voivodeship (south Poland)
- Łazy, Greater Poland Voivodeship (west-central Poland)
- Łazy, Bochnia County in Lesser Poland Voivodeship (south Poland)
- Łazy, Kraków County in Lesser Poland Voivodeship (south Poland)
- Łazy, part of the Bieżanów-Prokocim district of Kraków
- Łazy, Miechów County in Lesser Poland Voivodeship (south Poland)
- Łazy, Oświęcim County in Lesser Poland Voivodeship (south Poland)
- Łazy, Bełchatów County in Łódź Voivodeship (central Poland)
- Łazy, Radomsko County in Łódź Voivodeship (central Poland)
- Łazy, Lower Silesian Voivodeship (south-west Poland)
- Łazy, Lublin Voivodeship (east Poland)
- Łazy, Gmina Gubin, Krosno County in Lubusz Voivodeship (west Poland)
- Łazy, Żary County in Lubusz Voivodeship (west Poland)
- Łazy, Maków County in Masovian Voivodeship (east-central Poland)
- Łazy, Ostrołęka County in Masovian Voivodeship (east-central Poland)
- Łazy, Piaseczno County in Masovian Voivodeship (east-central Poland)
- Łazy, Przasnysz County in Masovian Voivodeship (east-central Poland)
- Łazy, Sierpc County in Masovian Voivodeship (east-central Poland)
- Łazy, Szydłowiec County in Masovian Voivodeship (east-central Poland)
- Łazy, Warsaw West County in Masovian Voivodeship (east-central Poland)
- Łazy, Węgrów County in Masovian Voivodeship (east-central Poland)
- Łazy, Żuromin County in Masovian Voivodeship (east-central Poland)
- Łazy, Opole Voivodeship (south-west Poland)
- Łazy, Podlaskie Voivodeship (north-east Poland)
- Łazy, Bielsko County in Silesian Voivodeship (south Poland)
- Łazy, Częstochowa County in Silesian Voivodeship (south Poland)
- Łazy, Lubliniec County in Silesian Voivodeship (south Poland)
- Łazy, Jarosław County in Subcarpathian Voivodeship (south-east Poland)
- Łazy, Gmina Rymanów in Subcarpathian Voivodeship (south-east Poland)
- Łazy, Koszalin County in West Pomeranian Voivodeship (north-west Poland)
- Łazy, Myślibórz County in West Pomeranian Voivodeship (north-west Poland)
- Lazy (Orlová), village, now part of the town of Orlová, Czech Republic

== See also ==
- Lazy (disambiguation)
