= Olympian 7 =

Olympian 7, 'For Diagoras of Rhodes', is an ode by the 5th century BC Greek poet Pindar.

== Background ==
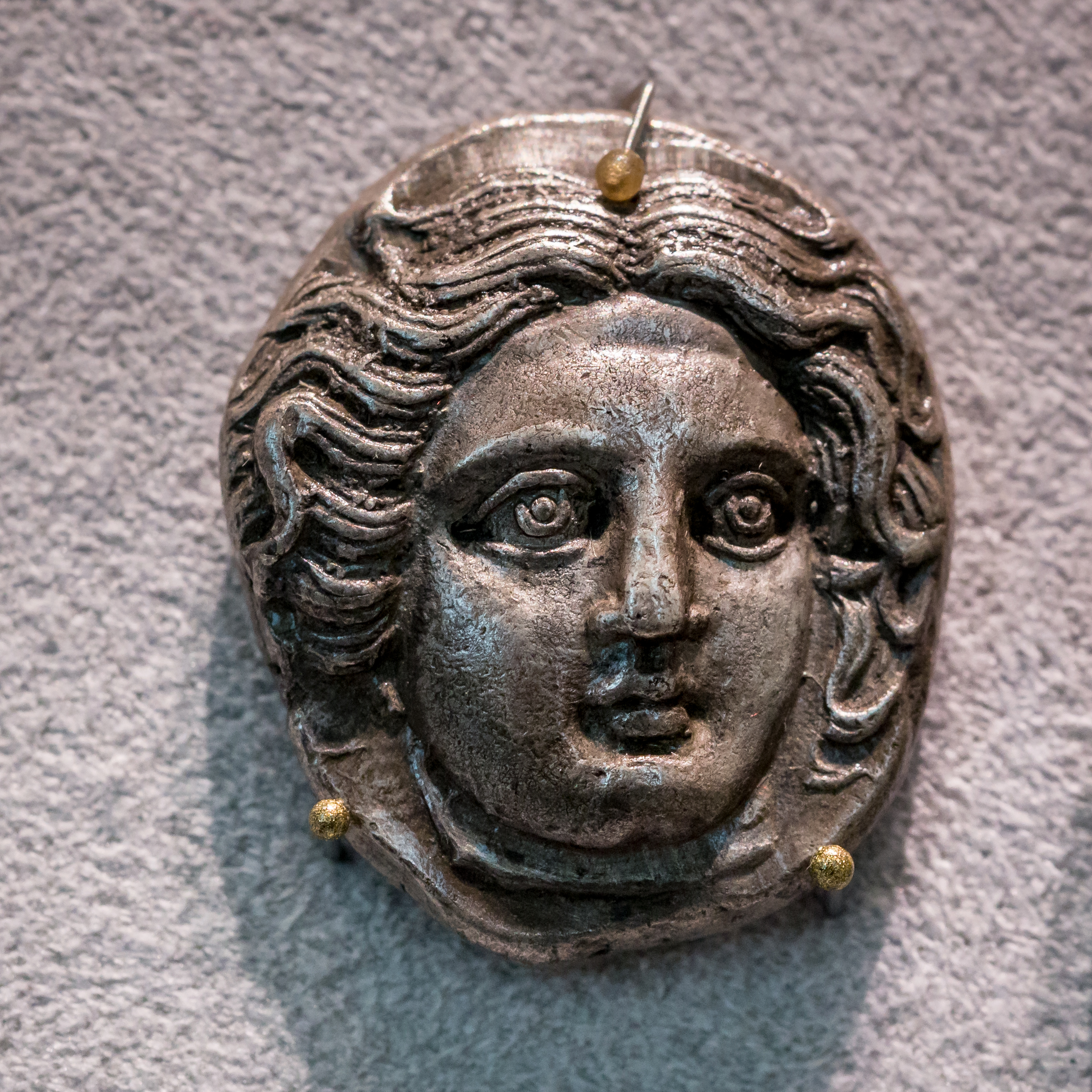
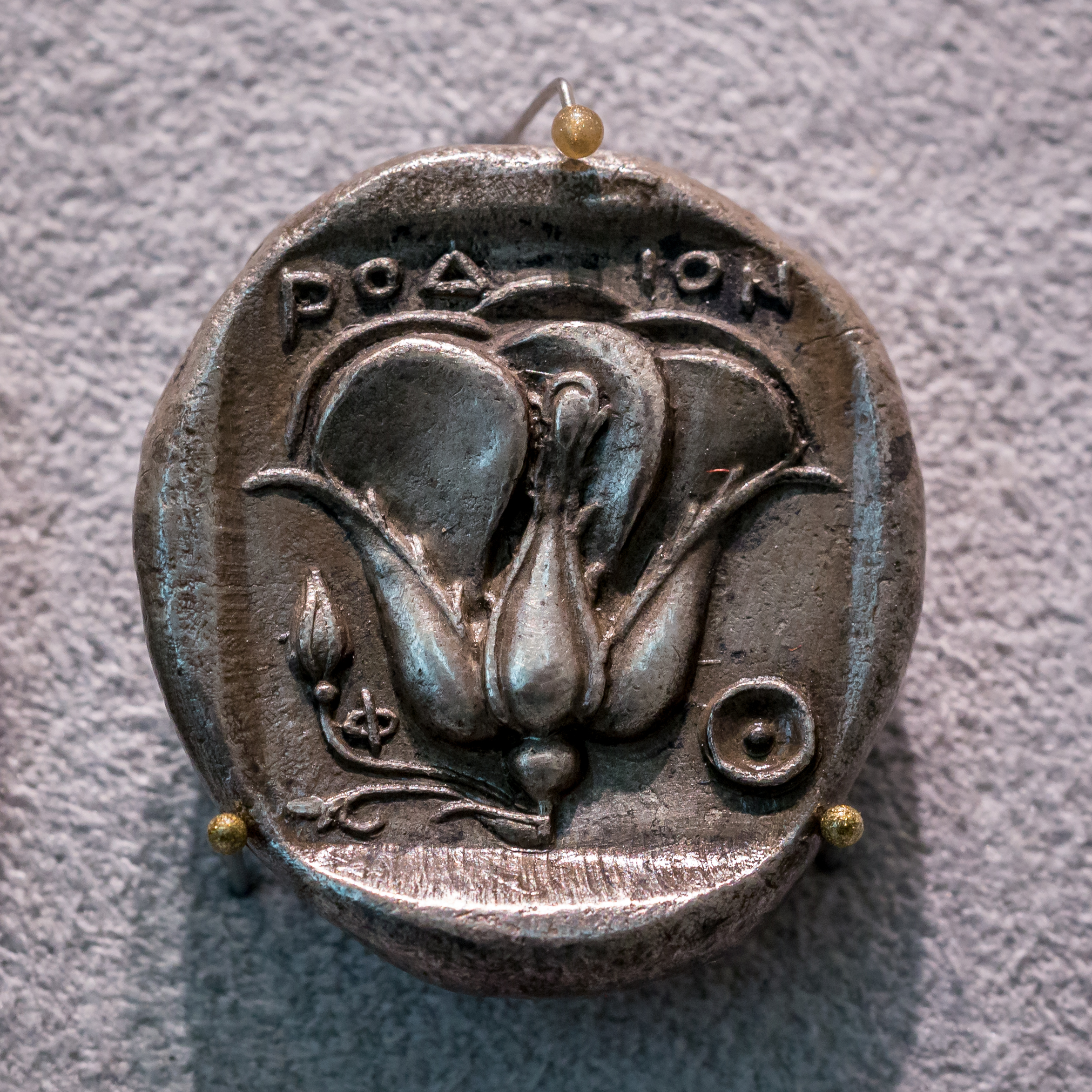
Tetradrachm of Rhodes, c. 404–385 BC. Head of Helios (obv.); rose (rev.)

The island of Rhodes was regarded in Greek legend as deriving its name from a daughter of Aphrodite, who became the bride of the Sun. The Sun-god had been absent when the other gods had divided the earth among them, but he had seen an island rising from the depths of the sea, and was permitted to have this island as his special boon (54–76). The sons of Helios were afterwards bidden to raise an altar on a height, and there to sacrifice to Zeus and Athena, but they had forgotten to bring fire, and thus the sacrifices which they offered were flameless; but the gods forgave them, and Zeus gave them gold, and Athena skill in handicraft (39–53). Further, one of the sons of Heracles, who had slain the brother of Alcmena, was sent by Apollo to Rhodes, where he became the founder of the Greek colony (27–34).

The Heracleidae occupied the three Rhodian cities of Lindus, Ialysus, and Cameirus. Ialysus particular was settled by the Eratidae, and to this family belonged Diagoras. His father was probably the prytanis of Ialysus. Diagoras himself had been successful, not only in the local contests, but also in all the great games of Greece. At his first Pythian victory he had apparently been guilty of some inadvertent transgression; possibly he had accidentally killed his opponent (cp. 10, 17, 24–30). He had now attained the crowning distinction of the prize for the boxing-match at Olympia in 464 BC. He was the most famous of Greek boxers. His three sons, and the two sons of his daughters, were also distinguished at Olympia, where a statue was set up in honour of Diagoras and his sons and grandsons.

== Summary ==
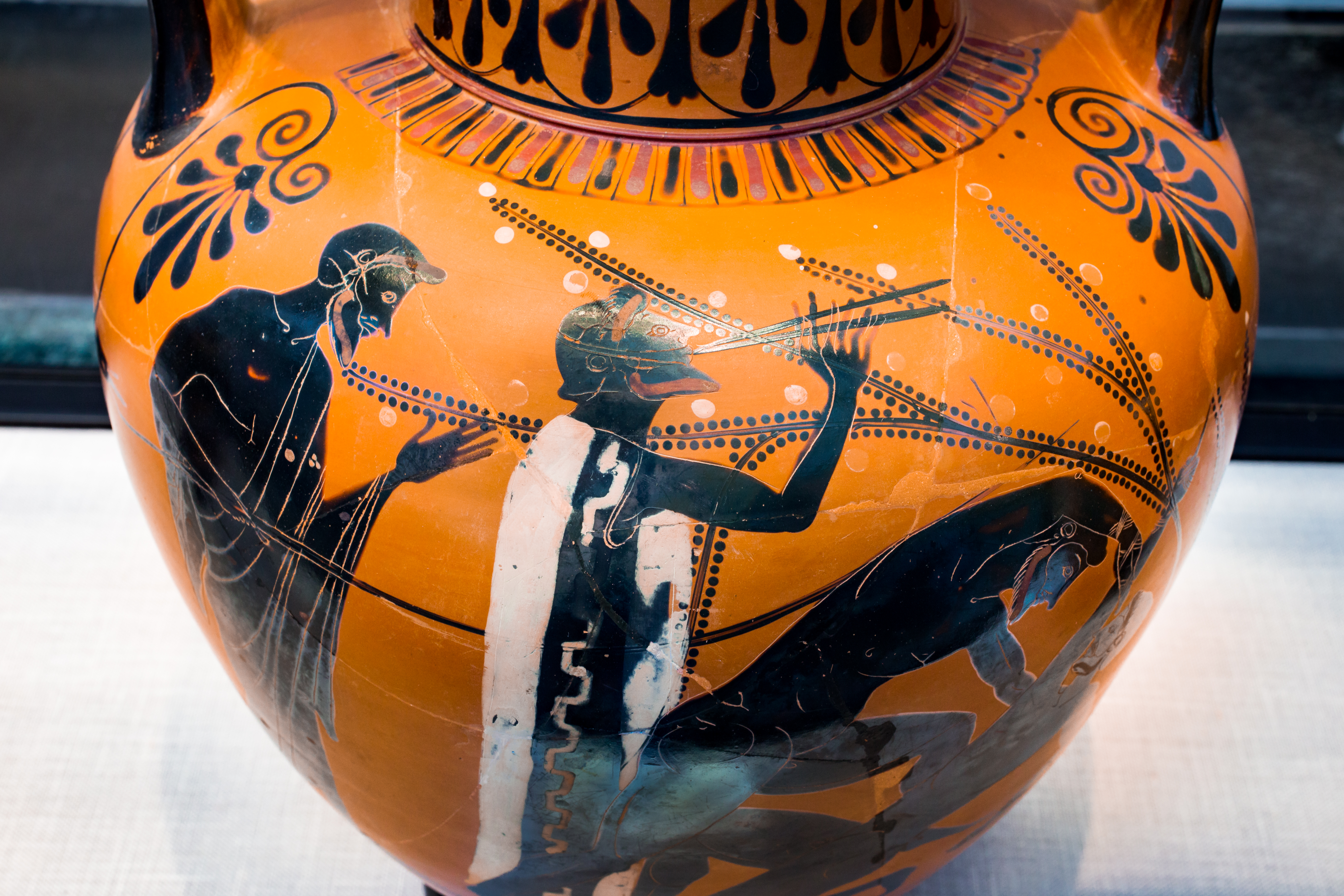
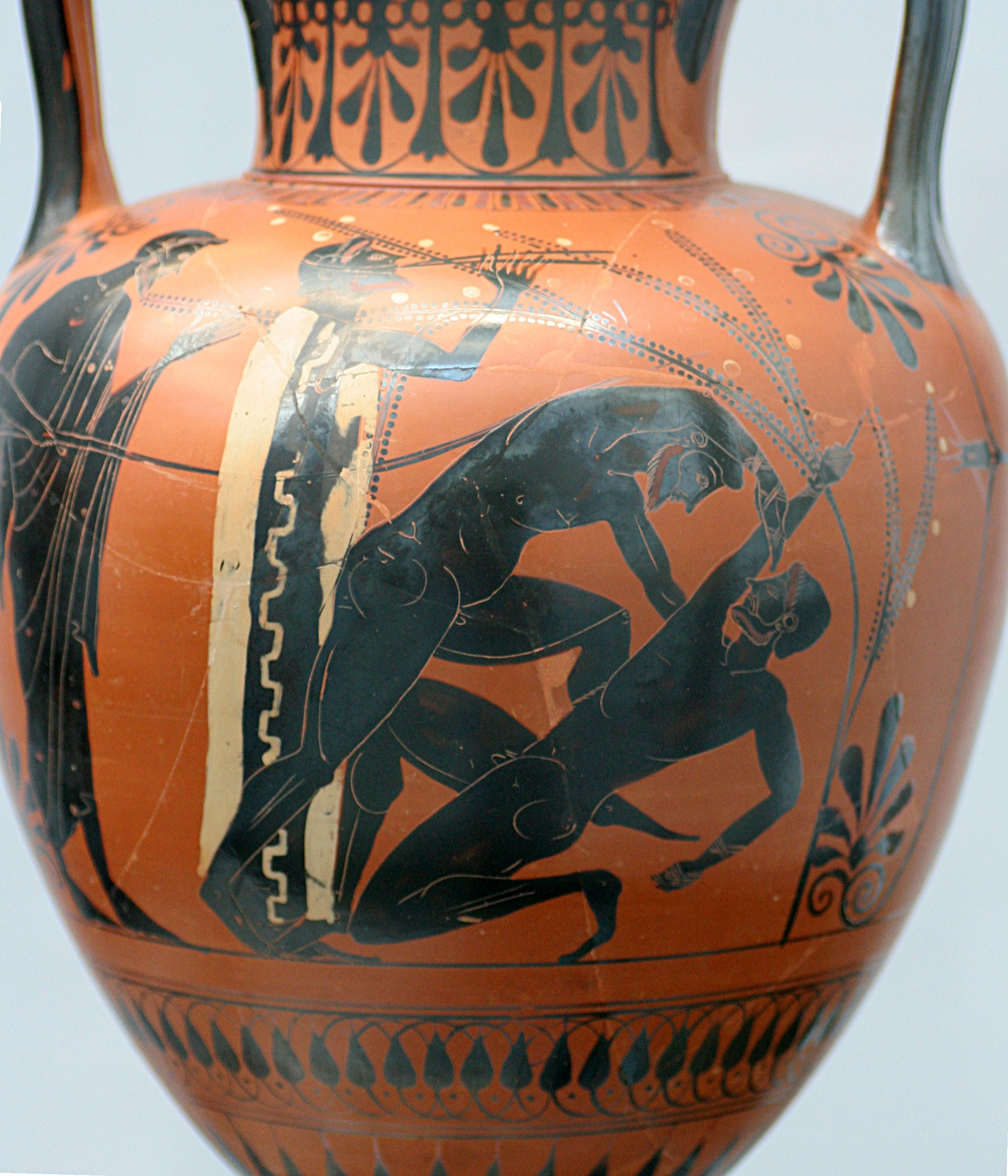
An aulist plays music in the background of a boxing-match (Attic vase, 510–500 BC)

The ode is compared to a loving-cup (1–10), presented to the bridegroom by the father of the bride. Even as the cup is the pledge of loving wedlock, so is the poet's song an earnest of abiding fame, but Charis, the gracious goddess of the epinician ode, looks with favour, now on one, now on another (10–12). The poet has come to Rhodes, to celebrate the victor and his father (13–19).

The myth of Tlepolemus, the Dorian founder of Ialysus (20–53), and the myth of the gift of the island of Rhodes to the Sun-god, one of whose sons was the father of the three heroes, who gave their names to Lindus, Ialysus, and Cameirus (54–76).

Tlepolemus is commemorated by athletic games in Rhodes, in which Diagoras has been victorious, as elsewhere (77–87). Zeus is besought to grant his blessing to the ode and to the victor (87–93). When that victor's clan is prosperous, the State rejoices, but Fortune is apt to be fickle (93–95).

== Reception ==
According to one of the Scholiasts, Gorgon (the historian of Rhodes) states that a copy of this ode, in letters of gold, was preserved in the temple of Athena at Lindus. It has been suggested that, possibly, the ode was transcribed in gold ink on a scroll of parchment.

== Sources ==
Attribution:

- Sandys, John, ed. (1915). The Odes of Pindar, including the Principal Fragments. Loeb Classical Library. New York: The Macmillan Co. pp. 68–81.
