= Gorgone =

Gorgone may refer to:

- Gorgone, an album by a jam project featuring Buckethead, Travis Dickerson, and Pinchface.
- Gorgone (moth), a genus of moth

== People with the surname ==
- Michelle Gorgone (born 1983), American snowboarder
- Giorgio Gorgone (born 1975), Italian footballer

== See also ==
- Gorgon (disambiguation)
