= Wrony =

Wrony may refer to the following places in Poland:

- Wrony, Lower Silesian Voivodeship (south-west Poland)
- Wrony, Łódź Voivodeship (central Poland)
- Wrony, Lubusz Voivodeship (west Poland)
- Wrony, Warmian-Masurian Voivodeship (north Poland)

== See also ==
- Crows (film), a 1994 Polish film
