= Przybyszów =

Przybyszów may refer to the following places:

- Przybyszów, Łódź Voivodeship (central Poland)
- Przybyszów, Subcarpathian Voivodeship (south-east Poland)
- Przybyszów, Świętokrzyskie Voivodeship (south-central Poland)
- Przybyszów, Greater Poland Voivodeship (west-central Poland)
- Przybyszów, Lubusz Voivodeship (west Poland)
