= Orzechówek =

Orzechówek may refer to:

- Orzechówek, Radomsko County, Poland
- Orzechówek, Zgierz County, Poland
