= Brzezinki =

Brzezinki may refer to:

- Brzezinki, Lower Silesian Voivodeship (south-west Poland)
- Brzezinki, Kuyavian-Pomeranian Voivodeship (north-central Poland)
- Brzezinki, West Pomeranian Voivodeship (north-west Poland)
- Brzezinki, Łódź Voivodeship (central Poland)
- Brzezinki, Jędrzejów County in Świętokrzyskie Voivodeship (south-central Poland)
- Brzezinki, Kielce County in Świętokrzyskie Voivodeship (south-central Poland)
- Brzezinki, Grójec County in Masovian Voivodeship (east-central Poland)
- Brzezinki, Przysucha County in Masovian Voivodeship (east-central Poland)
- Brzezinki, Radom County in Masovian Voivodeship (east-central Poland)
- Brzezinki, Gmina Opatów in Silesian Voivodeship (south Poland)
- Brzezinki, Gmina Wręczyca Wielka in Silesian Voivodeship (south Poland)
- Brzezinki, Opole Voivodeship (south-west Poland)
- Brzezinki, Pomeranian Voivodeship (north Poland)
