= Kamionka, Radomsko County =

Kamionka
- Village
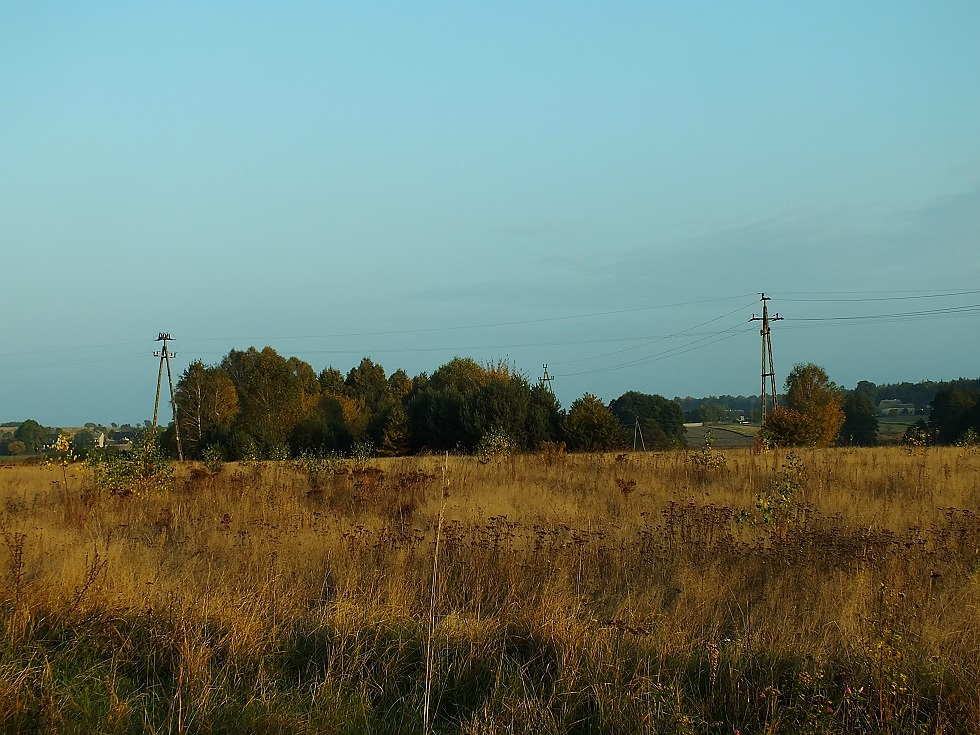

- Location within Poland
- Coordinates: 51°01′25″N 19°31′11″E
- Country: Poland
- Voivodeship: Łódź
- County: Radomsko
- Gmina: Kobiele Wielkie

Kamionka [kaˈmjɔnka] is a village in the administrative district of Gmina Kobiele Wielkie, within Radomsko County, Łódź Voivodeship, in central Poland.
