= Przeginia, Lesser Poland Voivodeship =

Przeginia
- Village
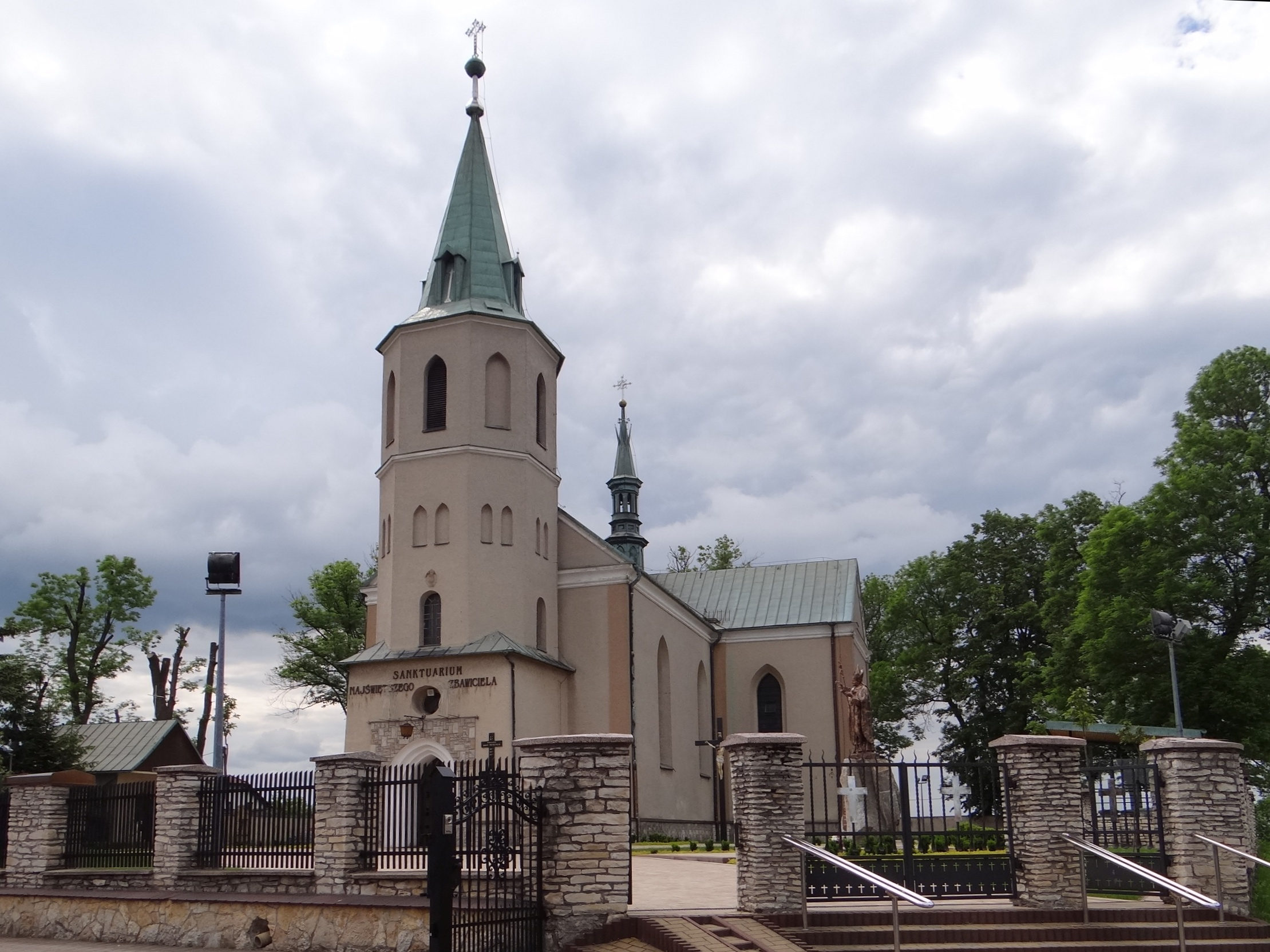
- Church of the Holy Savior

- Location within Poland
- Coordinates: 50°15′N 19°43′E
- Country: Poland
- Voivodeship: Lesser Poland
- County: Kraków
- Gmina: Jerzmanowice-Przeginia

Przeginia [pʂɛˈɡiɲa] is a village in the administrative district of Gmina Jerzmanowice-Przeginia, within Kraków County, Lesser Poland Voivodeship, in southern Poland.
