= Orzechów, Radomsko County =

Orzechów
- Village
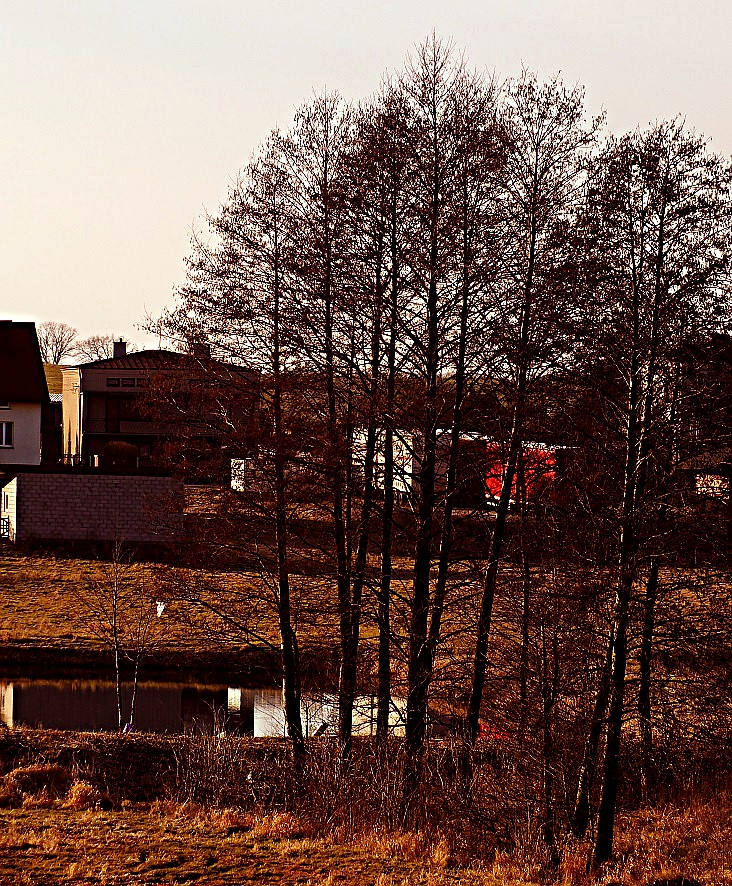

- Location within Poland
- Coordinates: 51°2′7″N 19°32′25″E
- Country: Poland
- Voivodeship: Łódź
- County: Radomsko
- Gmina: Kobiele Wielkie

Orzechów [ɔˈʐɛxuf] is a village in the administrative district of Gmina Kobiele Wielkie, within Radomsko County, Łódź Voivodeship, in central Poland.
