= Szklary, Lesser Poland Voivodeship =

Szklary
- Village
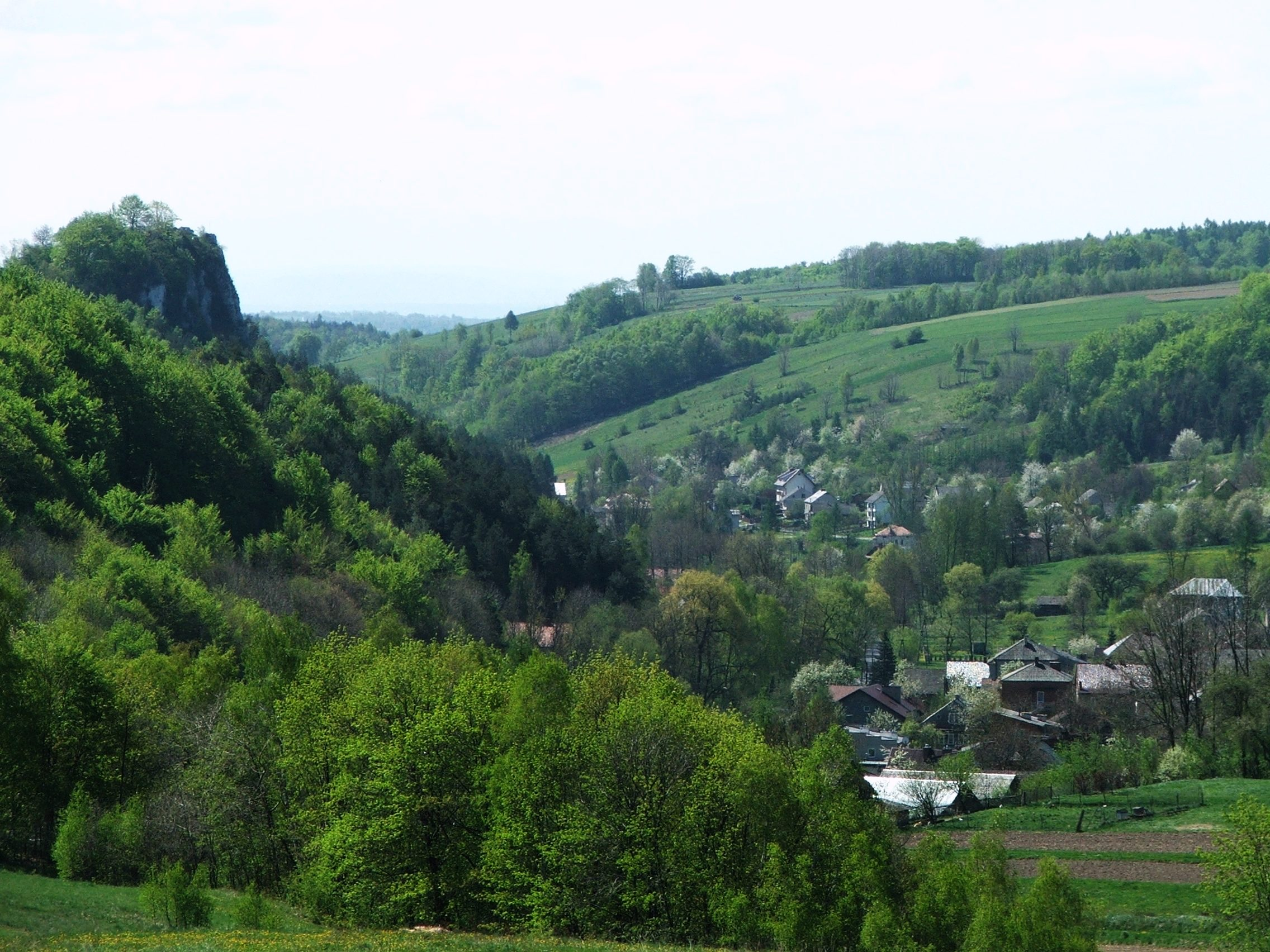

- Location within Poland
- Coordinates: 50°10′16″N 19°42′47″E
- Country: Poland
- Voivodeship: Lesser Poland
- County: Kraków
- Gmina: Jerzmanowice-Przeginia
- Population: 612

Szklary [ˈʂklarɨ] is a village in the administrative district of Gmina Jerzmanowice-Przeginia, within Kraków County, Lesser Poland Voivodeship, in southern Poland.
