= Olszynki, Łódź Voivodeship =

Olszynki
- Village
- Location within Poland
- Coordinates: 51°0′22″N 19°37′23″E
- Country: Poland
- Voivodeship: Łódź
- County: Radomsko
- Gmina: Kobiele Wielkie

Olszynki [ɔlˈʂɨŋki] is a village in the administrative district of Gmina Kobiele Wielkie, within Radomsko County, Łódź Voivodeship, in central Poland.
