= Cadów =

- Village
- Location within Poland
- Coordinates: 51°1′N 19°33′E
- Country: Poland
- Voivodeship: Łódź
- County: Radomsko
- Gmina: Kobiele Wielkie

Cadów [ˈt͡saduf] is a village in the administrative district of Gmina Kobiele Wielkie, within Radomsko County, Łódź Voivodeship, in central Poland.
