= Wymysłów, Gmina Kobiele Wielkie =

Wymysłów
- Village
- Location within Poland
- Coordinates: 50°59′21″N 19°40′12″E
- Country: Poland
- Voivodeship: Łódź
- County: Radomsko
- Gmina: Kobiele Wielkie

Wymysłów [vɨˈmɨswuf] is a village in the administrative district of Gmina Kobiele Wielkie, within Radomsko County, Łódź Voivodeship, in central Poland.
