= Huta Drewniana-Kolonia =

- Village
- Location within Poland
- Coordinates: 51°0′40″N 19°40′37″E
- Country: Poland
- Voivodeship: Łódź
- County: Radomsko
- Gmina: Kobiele Wielkie

Huta Drewniana-Kolonia [ˈxuta drɛvˈɲana kɔˈlɔɲa] is a village in the administrative district of Gmina Kobiele Wielkie, within Radomsko County, Łódź Voivodeship, in central Poland.
