= Czubrowice =

- Village
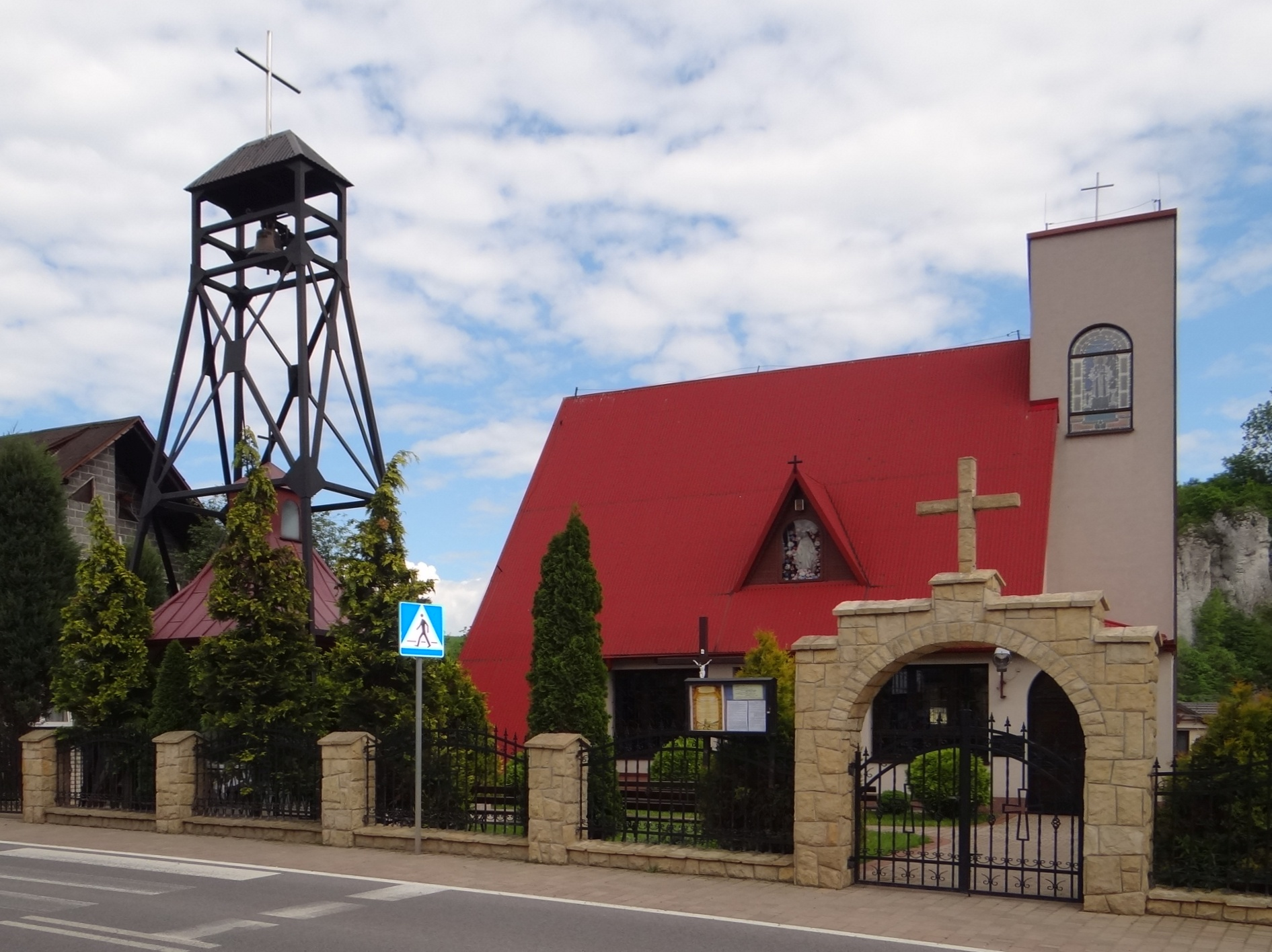
- Church

- Location within Poland
- Coordinates: 50°13′N 19°41′E
- Country: Poland
- Voivodeship: Lesser Poland
- County: Kraków
- Gmina: Jerzmanowice-Przeginia

Czubrowice [t͡ʂubrɔˈvit͡sɛ] is a village in the administrative district of Gmina Jerzmanowice-Przeginia, within Kraków County, Lesser Poland Voivodeship, in southern Poland.
