= Gotkowice =

- Village
- Location within Poland
- Coordinates: 50°13′30″N 19°44′7″E
- Country: Poland
- Voivodeship: Lesser Poland
- County: Kraków
- Gmina: Jerzmanowice-Przeginia

Gotkowice [ɡɔtkɔˈvit͡sɛ] is a village in the administrative district of Gmina Jerzmanowice-Przeginia, within Kraków County, Lesser Poland Voivodeship, in southern Poland.
