= Wola Rożkowa =

- Village
- Location within Poland
- Coordinates: 51°2′N 19°41′E
- Country: Poland
- Voivodeship: Łódź
- County: Radomsko
- Gmina: Kobiele Wielkie

Wola Rożkowa [ˈvɔla rɔʂˈkɔva] is a village in the administrative district of Gmina Kobiele Wielkie, within Radomsko County, Łódź Voivodeship, in central Poland.
