= Podświerk =

- Village
- Location within Poland
- Coordinates: 51°0′8″N 19°31′44″E
- Country: Poland
- Voivodeship: Łódź
- County: Radomsko
- Gmina: Kobiele Wielkie

Podświerk [ˈpɔtɕfjɛrk] is a village in the administrative district of Gmina Kobiele Wielkie, within Radomsko County, Łódź Voivodeship, in central Poland.
