= Cadówek =

- Village
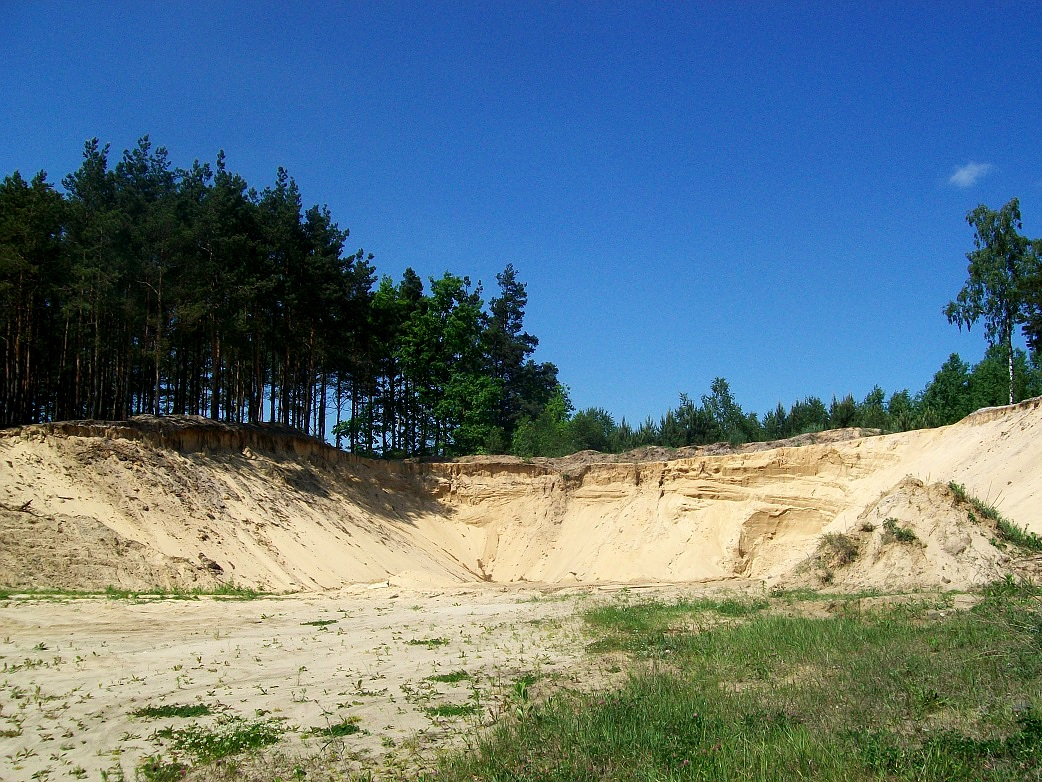

- Location within Poland
- Coordinates: 51°0′24″N 19°33′5″E
- Country: Poland
- Voivodeship: Łódź
- County: Radomsko
- Gmina: Kobiele Wielkie

Cadówek [t͡saˈduvɛk] is a village in the administrative district of Gmina Kobiele Wielkie, within Radomsko County, Łódź Voivodeship, in central Poland.
