= Babczów =

- Village
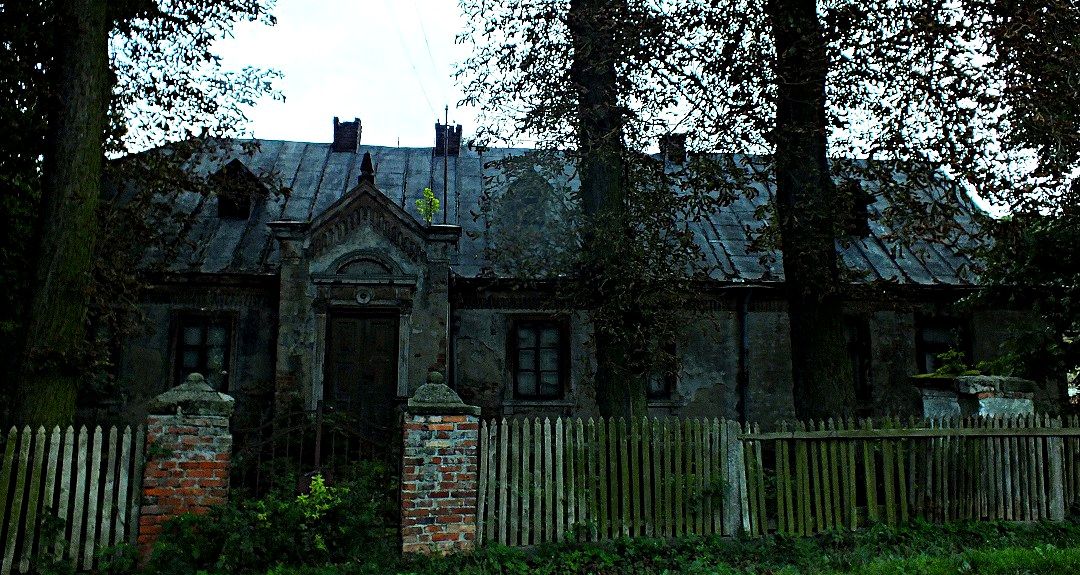

- Location within Poland
- Coordinates: 51°4′N 19°40′E
- Country: Poland
- Voivodeship: Łódź
- County: Radomsko
- Gmina: Kobiele Wielkie

Babczów [ˈbapt͡ʂuf] is a village in the administrative district of Gmina Kobiele Wielkie, within Radomsko County, Łódź Voivodeship, in central Poland.
