= Biestrzyków Mały =

- Village
- Location within Poland
- Coordinates: 51°4′N 19°42′E
- Country: Poland
- Voivodeship: Łódź
- County: Radomsko
- Gmina: Kobiele Wielkie

Biestrzyków Mały (Polish pronunciation: [bjɛstˈʂɨkuf ˈmawɨ]) is a village in the administrative district of Gmina Kobiele Wielkie, within Radomsko County, Łódź Voivodeship, in central Poland.
