= Hucisko Przybyszowskie =

- Village
- Location within Poland
- Coordinates: 51°1′55″N 19°34′34″E
- Country: Poland
- Voivodeship: Łódź
- County: Radomsko
- Gmina: Kobiele Wielkie

Hucisko Przybyszowskie [xuˈt͡ɕiskɔ pʂɨbɨˈʂɔfskʲɛ] is a village in the administrative district of Gmina Kobiele Wielkie, within Radomsko County, Łódź Voivodeship, in central Poland.
