= Świerczyny, Łódź Voivodeship =

Świerczyny
- Village
- Location within Poland
- Coordinates: 50°59′15″N 19°39′32″E
- Country: Poland
- Voivodeship: Łódź
- County: Radomsko
- Gmina: Kobiele Wielkie

Świerczyny (Polish pronunciation: [ɕfjɛrˈt͡ʂɨnɨ]) is a village in the administrative district of Gmina Kobiele Wielkie, within Radomsko County, Łódź Voivodeship, in central Poland.
