= Hucisko Małokobielskie =

- Village
- Location within Poland
- Coordinates: 51°0′10″N 19°38′0″E
- Country: Poland
- Voivodeship: Łódź
- County: Radomsko
- Gmina: Kobiele Wielkie

Hucisko Małokobielskie [xuˈt͡ɕiskɔ mawɔkɔˈbjɛlskʲɛ] is a village in the administrative district of Gmina Kobiele Wielkie, within Radomsko County, Łódź Voivodeship, in central Poland.
