= Ujazdówek, Łódź Voivodeship =

Ujazdówek
- Village
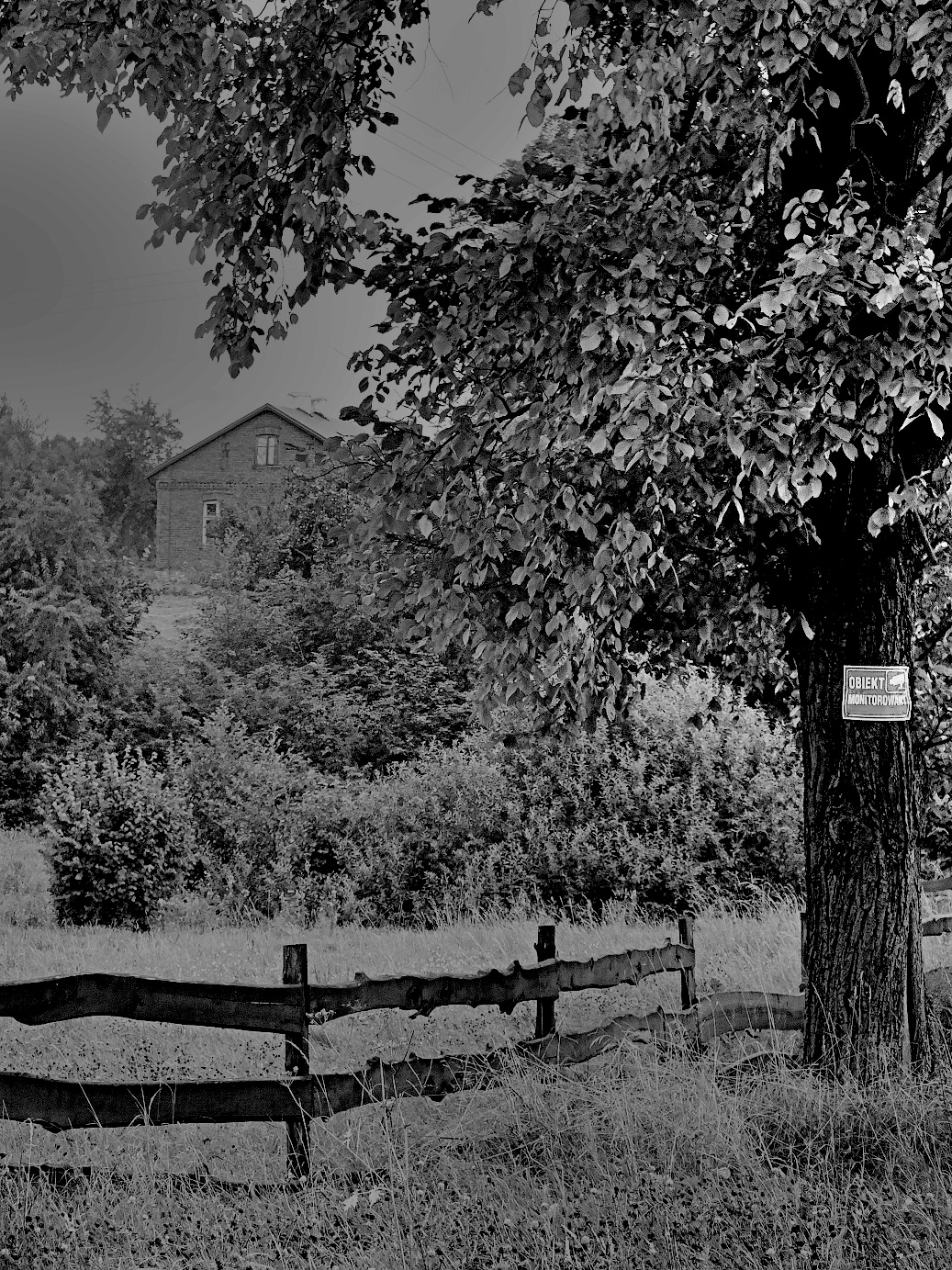

- Location within Poland
- Coordinates: 51°2′43″N 19°39′2″E
- Country: Poland
- Voivodeship: Łódź
- County: Radomsko
- Gmina: Kobiele Wielkie
- Population: 59 (2,023)

Ujazdówek [ujazˈduvɛk] is a village in the administrative district of Gmina Kobiele Wielkie, within Radomsko County, Łódź Voivodeship, in central Poland.
