= Jerzmanowice, Lesser Poland Voivodeship =

Jerzmanowice
- Village
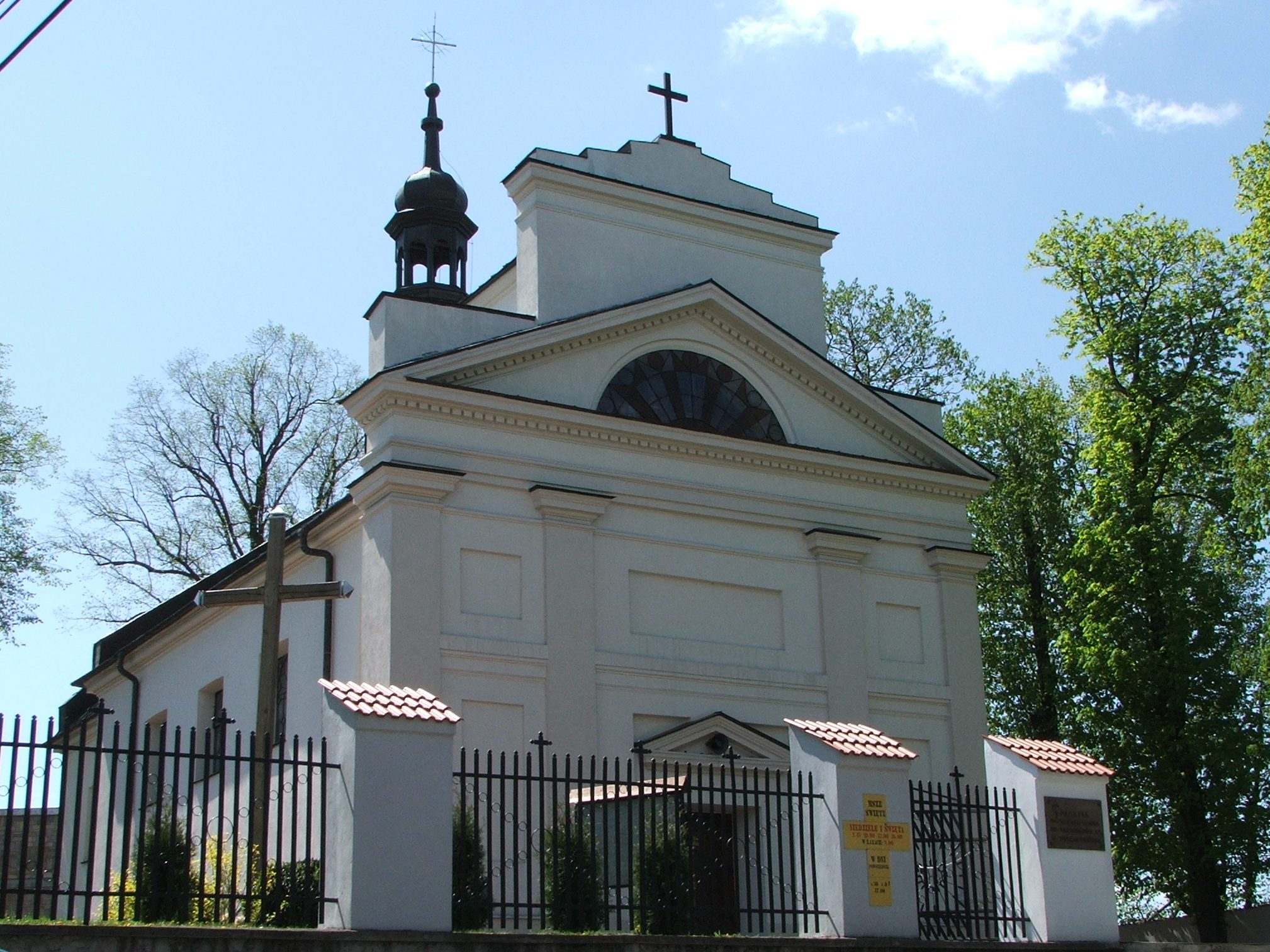
- Saint Bartholomew church

- Location within Poland
- Coordinates: 50°13′3″N 19°45′25″E
- Country: Poland
- Voivodeship: Lesser Poland
- County: Kraków
- Gmina: Jerzmanowice-Przeginia

Jerzmanowice [jɛʐmanɔˈvit͡sɛ] is a village in Kraków County, Lesser Poland Voivodeship, in southern Poland. It is the seat of the gmina (administrative district) called Gmina Jerzmanowice-Przeginia.
