= Gorgon (comics) =

Gorgon, in comics, may refer to:

- Gorgon (Inhuman), a Marvel Comics superhero
- Gorgon (DC Comics), a DC supervillain
- Gorgon (Tomi Shishido), a Marvel Comics supervillain
- Gorgon, a DC Comics character and member of the Hybrids

== See also ==
- Gorgon (disambiguation)
