= Cieszątki =

- Village
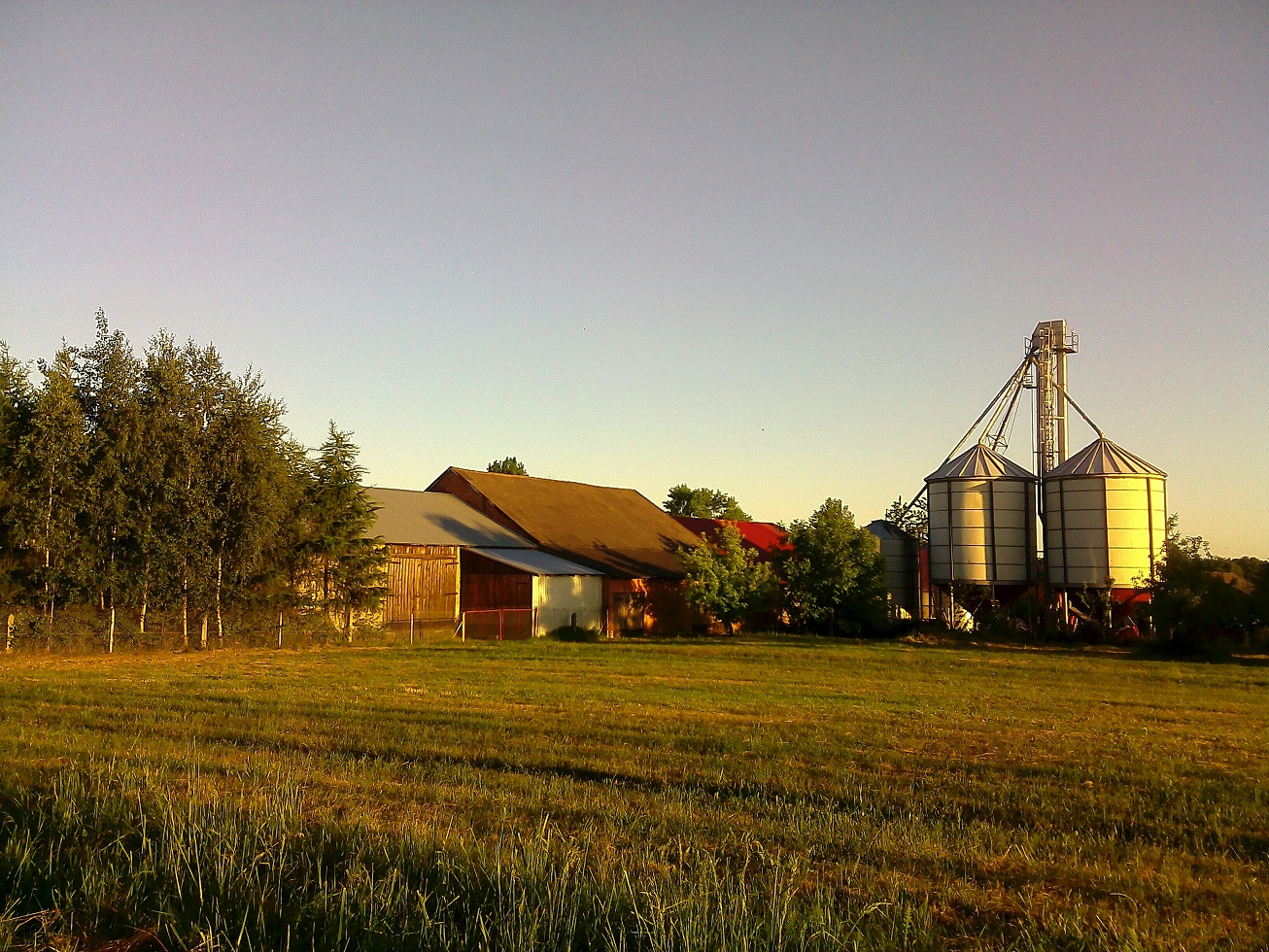

- Location within Poland
- Coordinates: 51°4′N 19°36′E
- Country: Poland
- Voivodeship: Łódź
- County: Radomsko
- Gmina: Kobiele Wielkie

Cieszątki [t͡ɕɛˈʂɔntki] is a village in the administrative district of Gmina Kobiele Wielkie, within Radomsko County, Łódź Voivodeship, in central Poland.

In the years 1975-1998 the town administratively belonged to the province of Piotrków.
