= Dudki, Radomsko County =

Dudki
- Village
- Location within Poland
- Coordinates: 50°59′39″N 19°39′15″E
- Country: Poland
- Voivodeship: Łódź
- County: Radomsko
- Gmina: Kobiele Wielkie

Dudki [ˈdutki] is a village in the administrative district of Gmina Kobiele Wielkie, within Radomsko County, Łódź Voivodeship, in central Poland.
