= Sąspów =

- Village
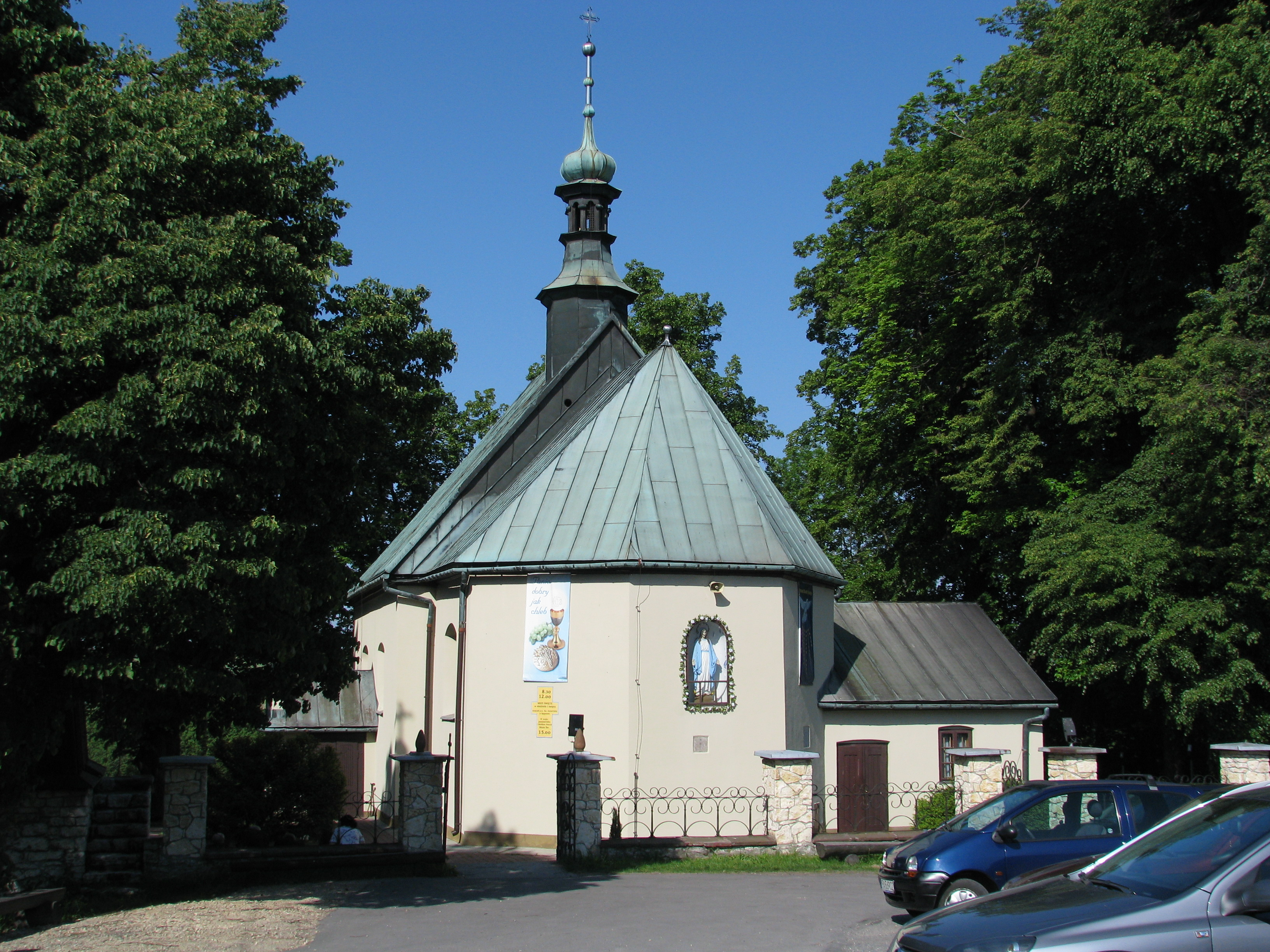
- Local Catholic church

- Location within Poland
- Coordinates: 50°13′44″N 19°46′10″E
- Country: Poland
- Voivodeship: Lesser Poland
- County: Kraków
- Gmina: Jerzmanowice-Przeginia
- Elevation: 458 m (1,503 ft)
- Population: 1,361

Sąspów [ˈsɔ̃spuf] is a village in the administrative district of Gmina Jerzmanowice-Przeginia, within Kraków County, Lesser Poland Voivodeship, in southern Poland.
