= Gmina Jerzmanowice-Przeginia =

Administrative district in southern Poland

Gmina Jerzmanowice-Przeginia Jerzmanowice-Przeginia Commune
- Gmina
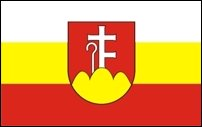
- Flag Coat of arms
- Interactive map of Gmina Jerzmanowice-Przeginia
- Coordinates (Jerzmanowice): 50°13′3″N 19°45′25″E
- Country: Poland
- Voivodeship: Lesser Poland
- County: Kraków County
- Seat: Jerzmanowice

Area
  - Total: 68.39 km^{2} (26.41 sq mi)

Population (2006)
  - Total: 10,432
  - Density: 152.5/km^{2} (395.1/sq mi)
- Website: http://www.jerzmanowice-przeginia.pl/

Gmina Jerzmanowice-Przeginia is a rural gmina (administrative district) in Kraków County, Lesser Poland Voivodeship, in southern Poland. Its seat is the village of Jerzmanowice, which lies approximately 22 kilometres (14 mi) north-west of the regional capital Kraków.

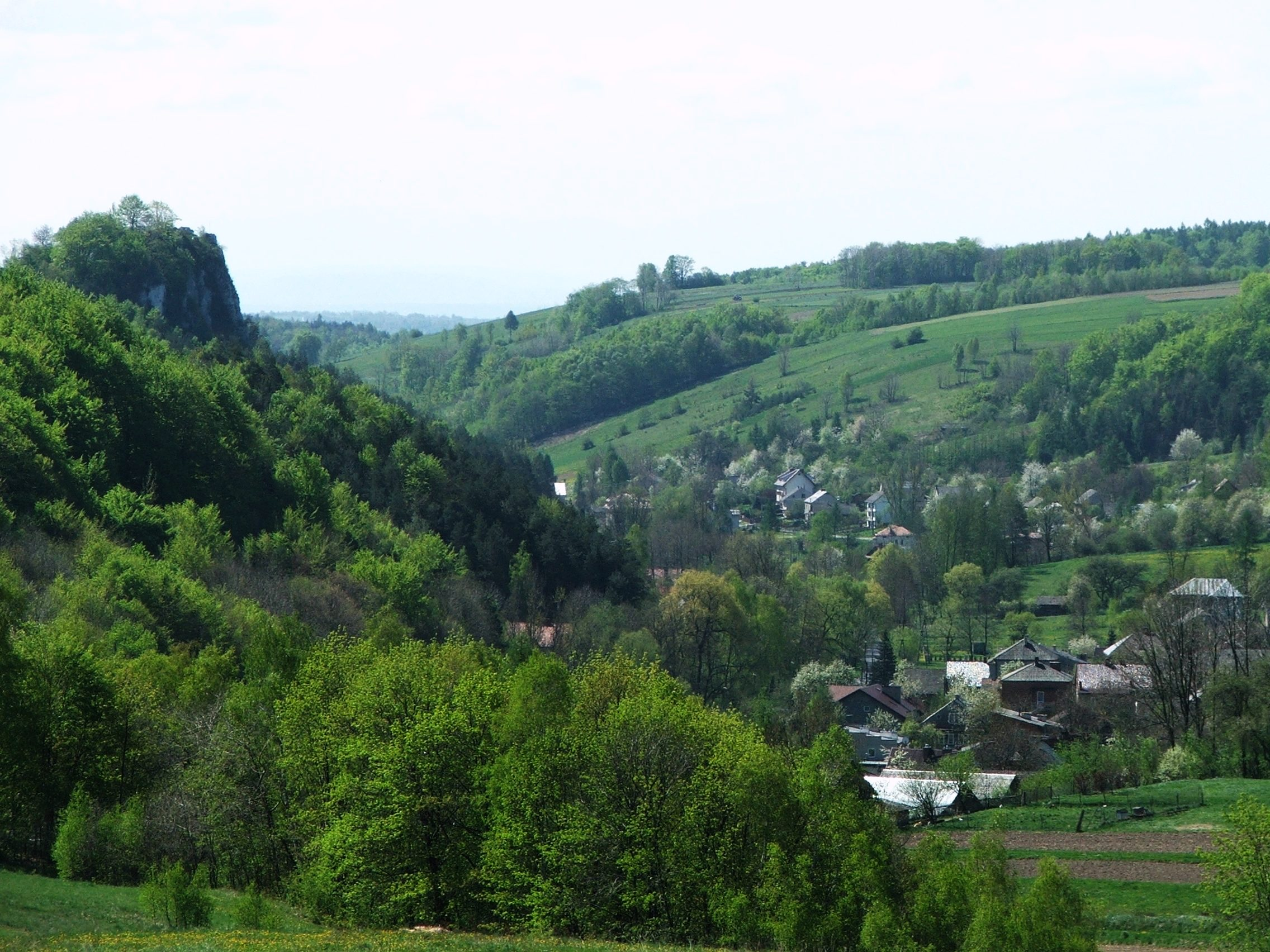

The gmina covers an area of 68.39 square kilometres (26.4 sq mi), and as of 2006 its total population is 10,432.

The gmina contains part of the protected area called Kraków Valleys Landscape Park.

== Villages ==
Gmina Jerzmanowice-Przeginia contains the villages and settlements of Czubrowice, Gotkowice, Jerzmanowice, Łazy, Przeginia, Racławice, Sąspów and Szklary.

== Neighbouring gminas ==
Gmina Jerzmanowice-Przeginia is bordered by the gminas of Krzeszowice, Olkusz, Skała, Sułoszowa, Wielka Wieś and Zabierzów.
