= Kobiele Wielkie =

- Village
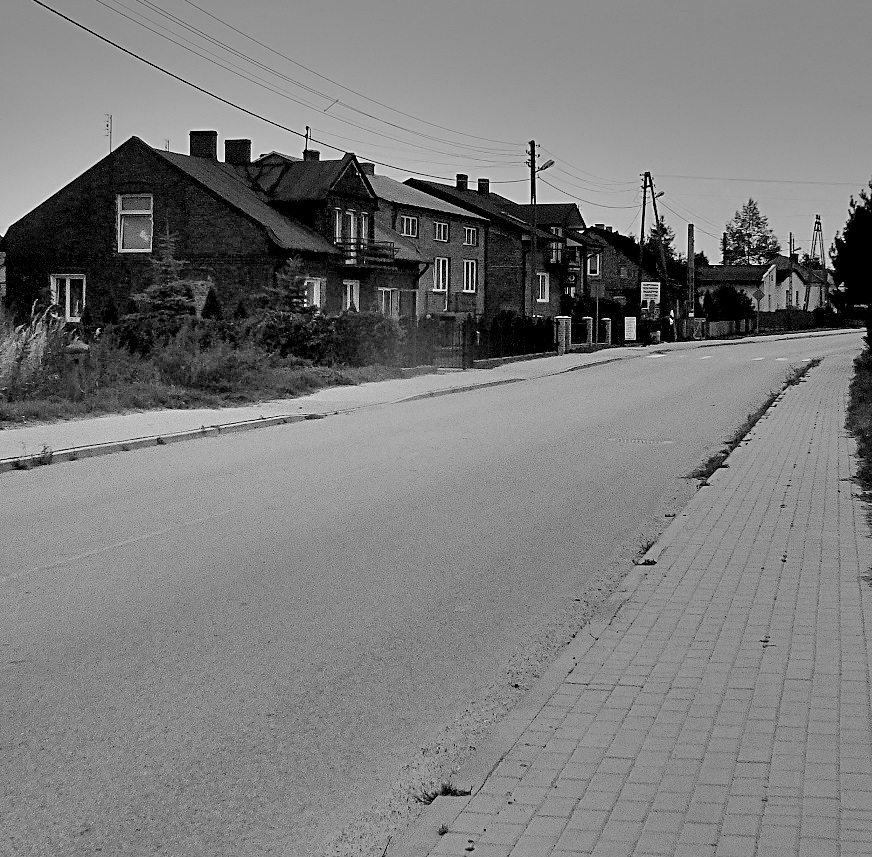

- Location within Poland
- Coordinates: 51°2′1″N 19°37′25″E
- Country: Poland
- Voivodeship: Łódź
- County: Radomsko
- Gmina: Kobiele Wielkie
- Population (approx.): 800

Kobiele Wielkie [kɔˈbjɛlɛ ˈvjɛlkʲɛ] is a village in Radomsko County, Łódź Voivodeship, in central Poland. It is the seat of the gmina (administrative district) called Gmina Kobiele Wielkie.

The village has an approximate population of 800.

It is the birthplace of Nobel laureate, writer Władysław Reymont. There are two monuments commemorating him, in the village.
