= Przyborów, Radomsko County =

Przyborów
- Village
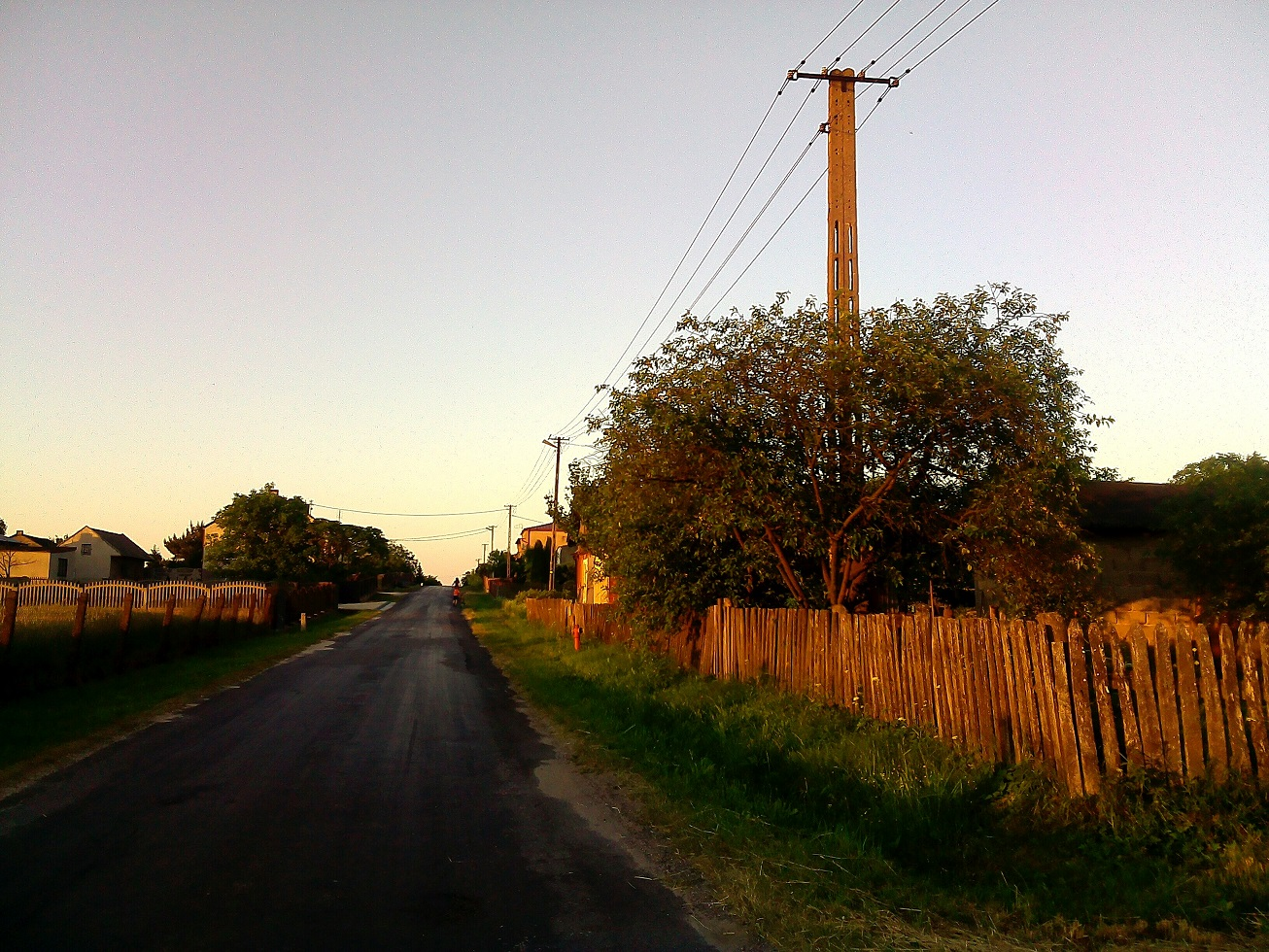

- Location within Poland
- Coordinates: 51°1′6″N 19°35′16″E
- Country: Poland
- Voivodeship: Łódź
- County: Radomsko
- Gmina: Kobiele Wielkie

Przyborów [pʂɨˈbɔruf] is a village in the administrative district of Gmina Kobiele Wielkie, within Radomsko County, Łódź Voivodeship, in central Poland.
