= Posadówka =

- Village
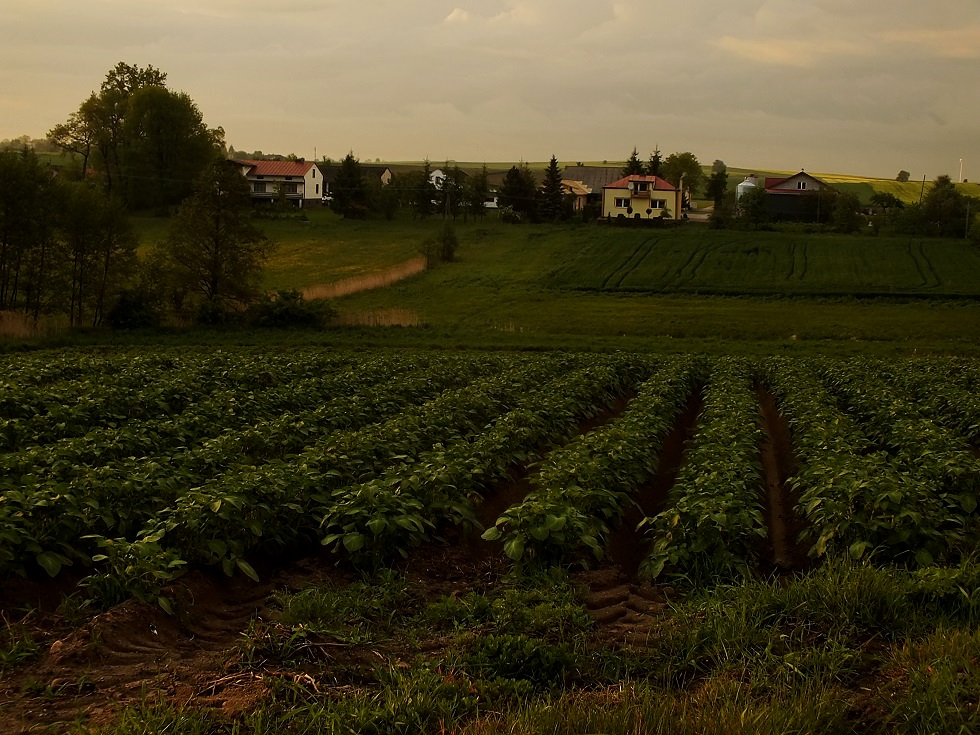

- Location within Poland
- Coordinates: 51°3′N 19°33′E
- Country: Poland
- Voivodeship: Łódź
- County: Radomsko
- Gmina: Kobiele Wielkie

Posadówka [pɔsaˈdufka] is a village in the administrative district of Gmina Kobiele Wielkie, within Radomsko County, Łódź Voivodeship, in central Poland.
