= Nowy Widok =

- Village
- Location within Poland
- Coordinates: 51°1′5″N 19°41′1″E
- Country: Poland
- Voivodeship: Łódź
- County: Radomsko
- Gmina: Kobiele Wielkie
- Population: 80

Nowy Widok [ˈnɔvɨ ˈvidɔk] is a village in the administrative district of Gmina Kobiele Wielkie, within Radomsko County, Łódź Voivodeship, in central Poland.
