= Przydatki Przybyszowskie =

- Village
- Location within Poland
- Coordinates: 51°3′20″N 19°39′45″E
- Country: Poland
- Voivodeship: Łódź
- County: Radomsko
- Gmina: Kobiele Wielkie

Przydatki Przybyszowskie [pʂɨˈdatki pʂɨbɨˈʂɔfskʲɛ] is a village in the administrative district of Gmina Kobiele Wielkie, within Radomsko County, Łódź Voivodeship, in central Poland.
