= Karsy, Łódź Voivodeship =

Karsy
- Village
- Location within Poland
- Coordinates: 51°0′46″N 19°36′33″E
- Country: Poland
- Voivodeship: Łódź
- County: Radomsko
- Gmina: Kobiele Wielkie

Karsy [ˈkarsɨ] is a village in the administrative district of Gmina Kobiele Wielkie, within Radomsko County, Łódź Voivodeship, in central Poland.
