= Biestrzyków Wielki =

- Village
- Location within Poland
- Coordinates: 51°5′N 19°41′E
- Country: Poland
- Voivodeship: Łódź
- County: Radomsko
- Gmina: Kobiele Wielkie

Biestrzyków Wielki (Polish pronunciation: [bjɛstˈʂɨkuv ˈvjɛlkʲi]) is a village in the administrative district of Gmina Kobiele Wielkie, within Radomsko County, Łódź Voivodeship, in central Poland.
