= Łowicz, Radomsko County =

Łowicz
- Village
- Location within Poland
- Coordinates: 51°1′N 19°33′E
- Country: Poland
- Voivodeship: Łódź
- County: Radomsko
- Gmina: Kobiele Wielkie
- Population (approx.): 200

Łowicz [ˈwɔvit͡ʂ] is a village in the administrative district of Gmina Kobiele Wielkie, within Radomsko County, Łódź Voivodeship, in central Poland.

The village has an approximate population of 200.
