= Racławice, Kraków County =

Racławice
- Village
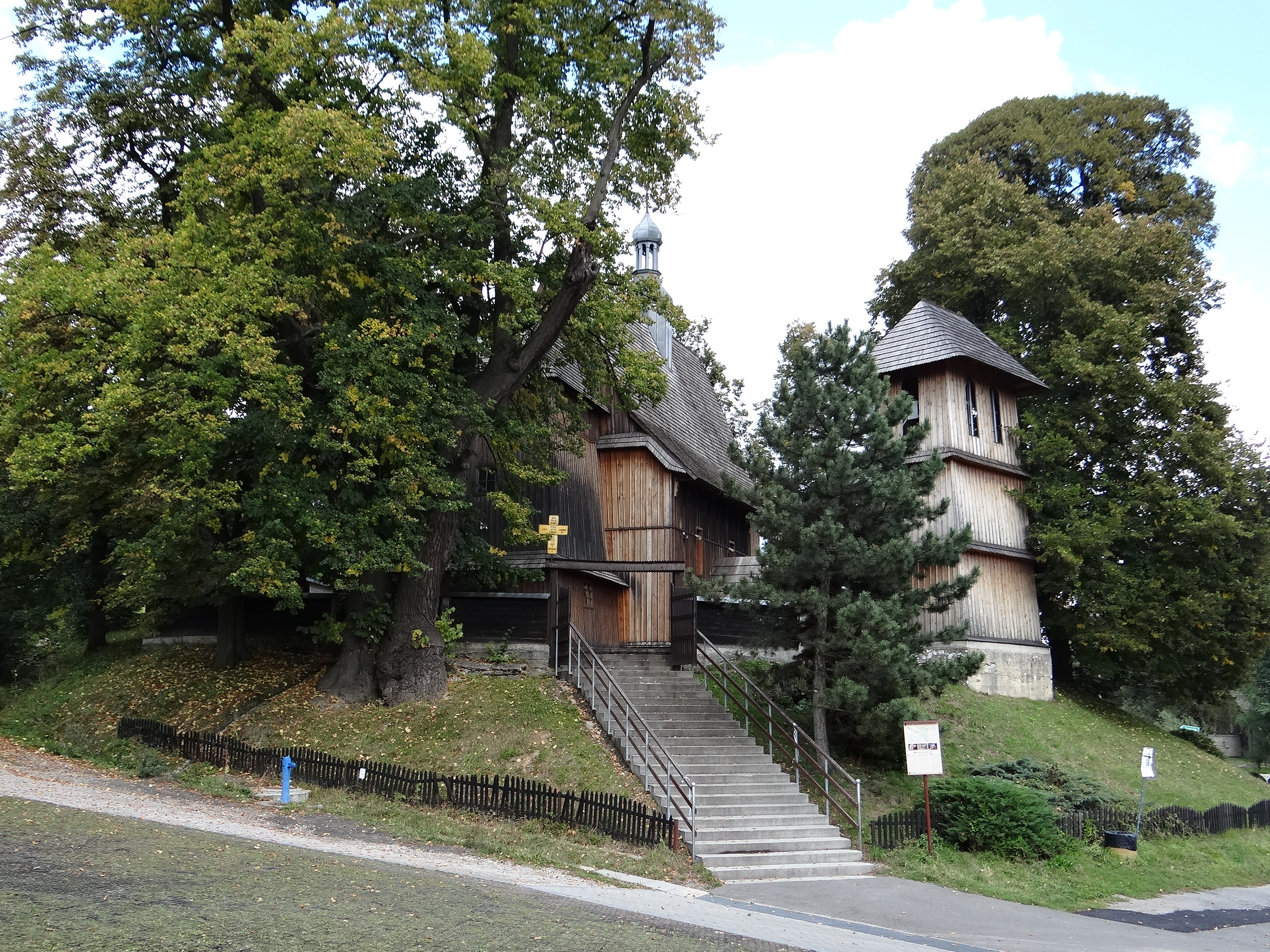
- Church of the Nativity of the Virgin Mary

- Location within Poland
- Coordinates: 50°12′N 19°41′E
- Country: Poland
- Voivodeship: Lesser Poland
- County: Kraków
- Gmina: Jerzmanowice-Przeginia

Racławice [rat͡swaˈvit͡sɛ] is a village in the administrative district of Gmina Jerzmanowice-Przeginia, within Kraków County, Lesser Poland Voivodeship, in southern Poland. Religions: Roman Catholicism (The Church), Jehovah's Witnesses (1%).
