= Gmina Kobiele Wielkie =

Gmina Kobiele Wielkie Kobiele Wielkie Commune
- Gmina

- Flag Coat of arms
- Interactive map of Gmina Kobiele Wielkie
- Coordinates (Kobiele Wielkie): 51°2′1″N 19°37′25″E
- Country: Poland
- Voivodeship: Łódź
- County: Radomsko
- Seat: Kobiele Wielkie

Area
  - Total: 101.85 km^{2} (39.32 sq mi)

Population (2006)
  - Total: 4,434
  - Density: 43.53/km^{2} (112.8/sq mi)
- Time zone: UTC+1 (CET)
  - Summer (DST): UTC+2 (CEST)
- Website: kobielewielkie.pl

Gmina Kobiele Wielkie is a rural gmina (administrative district) in Radomsko County, Łódź Voivodeship, in central Poland. Its seat is the village of Kobiele Wielkie, which lies approximately 13 kilometres (8 mi) east of Radomsko and 84 km (52 mi) south of the regional capital Łódź.

The gmina covers an area of 101.85 square kilometres (39.3 sq mi), and as of 2006 its total population is 4,434.

== Villages ==
Gmina Kobiele Wielkie contains the villages and settlements of:

- Babczów
- Biestrzyków Mały
- Biestrzyków Wielki
- Brzezinki
- Bukienka
- Cadów
- Cadówek
- Cieszątki
- Dudki
- Gorgoń
- Hucisko Małokobielskie
- Hucisko Przybyszowskie
- Huta Drewniana
- Huta Drewniana-Kolonia
- Jasień
- Kamionka
- Karsy
- Katarzynów
- Kobiele Małe
- Kobiele Małe-Kolonia
- Kobiele Wielkie
- Łazy
- Łowicz
- Nadrożne
- Nowy Widok
- Olszynki
- Orzechów
- Orzechówek
- Podświerk
- Posadówka
- Przyborów
- Przybyszów
- Przydatki Przybyszowskie
- Rozpęd
- Stary Widok
- Świerczyny
- Ujazdówek
- Wola Rożkowa
- Wrony
- Wymysłów
- Zrąbiec

Gmina Kobiele Wielkie is bordered by the gminas of Gidle, Kodrąb, Masłowice, Radomsko, Wielgomłyny and Żytno.
