= Łazy, Kraków County =

Łazy
- Village
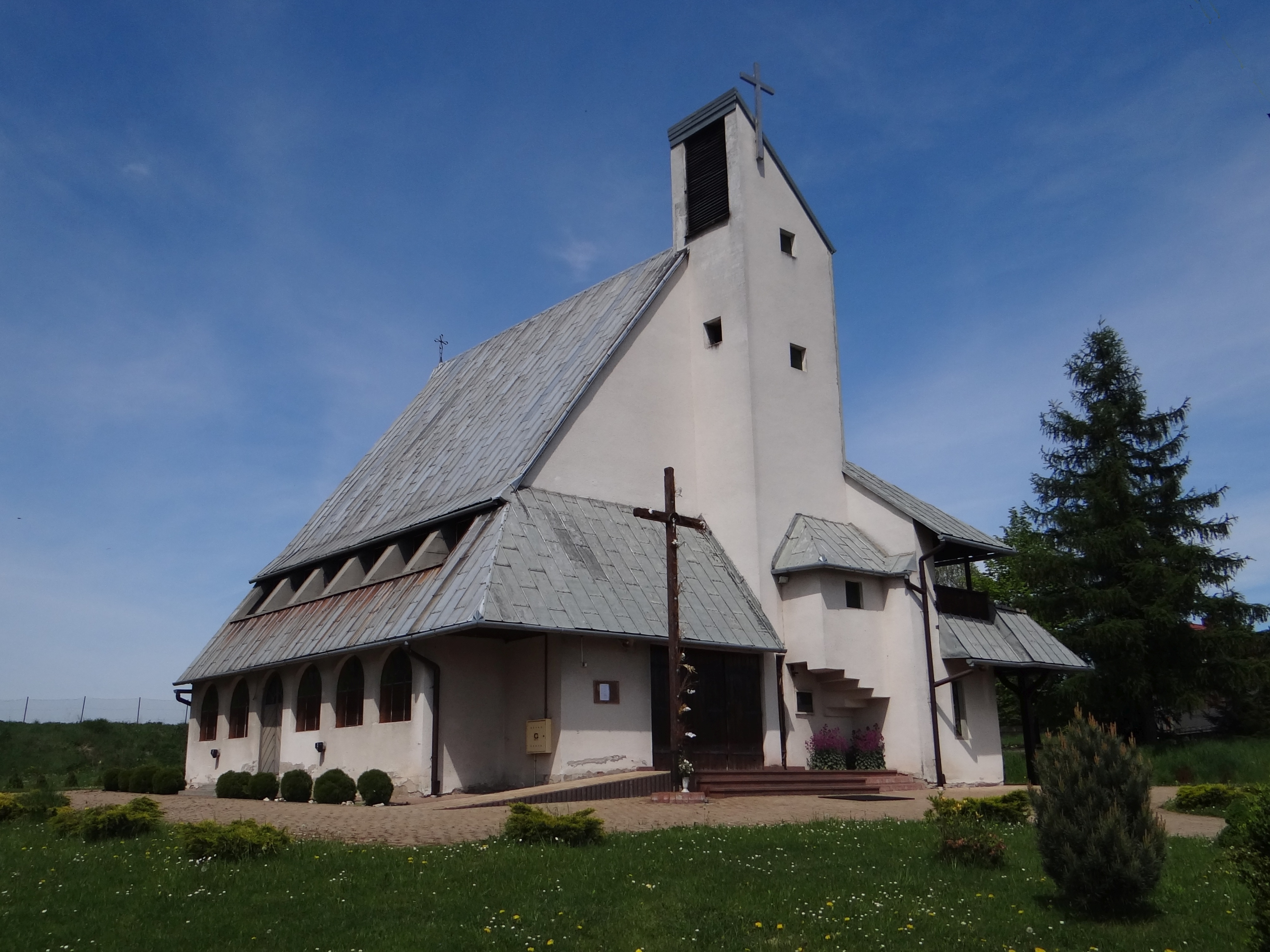
- Church

- Location within Poland
- Coordinates: 50°11′N 19°44′E
- Country: Poland
- Voivodeship: Lesser Poland
- County: Kraków
- Gmina: Jerzmanowice-Przeginia
- Elevation: 450 m (1,480 ft)

Łazy [ˈwazɨ] is a village in the administrative district of Gmina Jerzmanowice-Przeginia, within Kraków County, Lesser Poland Voivodeship, in southern Poland.
