= Saint-Gorgon =

Saint-Gorgon is the name or part of the name of several communes in France:

- Saint-Gorgon, in the Morbihan department
- Saint-Gorgon, in the Vosges department
- Saint-Gorgon-Main, in the Doubs department
