= Wrony, Łódź Voivodeship =

Wrony
- Village
- Location within Poland
- Coordinates: 51°0′42″N 19°30′34″E
- Country: Poland
- Voivodeship: Łódź
- County: Radomsko
- Gmina: Kobiele Wielkie

Wrony [ˈvrɔnɨ] is a village in the administrative district of Gmina Kobiele Wielkie, within Radomsko County, Łódź Voivodeship, in central Poland.
