= The Hot Monkey =

American musician

- Origin: Memphis, Tennessee
- Genres: Alternative rock Indie rock
- Years active: 1985–present
- Labels: Shangri-La Records; Personal Favorite; Sugar Ditch
- Members: Scott Taylor

The Hot Monkey is the name under which Memphis musician Scott Taylor (The Grifters, Porch Ghouls, StickyIckyIcky, Chopper Girl and Memphis Babylon) records and performs his solo material, as well as early versions of his Grifters contributions. His album More Than Lazy was described as low-key, lo-fi. Taylor, along with his Grifters bandmate Tripp Lamkins, has played dates in the Midwest and South. According to Billboard Taylor was due to record a Hot Monkey 7-inch for Sub Pop in 1998.

He also runs the Memphis hip hop label, Hoodoo Labs.

== Discography ==
- Lion (Personal Favorite/Positive Force (reissue), 1989/1996)
  - recorded between 1985 and 1989
- Shark b/w Depends 7-inch (Shangri-La 005, 1993)
  - recorded May 1986/Summer 1985
- "Sain" split 7-inch single with Linda Heck (Shangri-La 007, 1994)
  - recorded 1992
- Lazy 10-inch, (Shangri-La 009, 1994)
  - recorded 1994
- "Hambone's Meditations" 7-inch split with Ross Johnson & Jim Dickonson, (Sugar Ditch Records, 1995)
  - The Hot Monkey: "Whole Lotta Shakin'"
- "More Than Lazy" (Shangri-la 020, 1996)
  - recorded 1994–1996
