= Łazy, Radomsko County =

Łazy
- Village
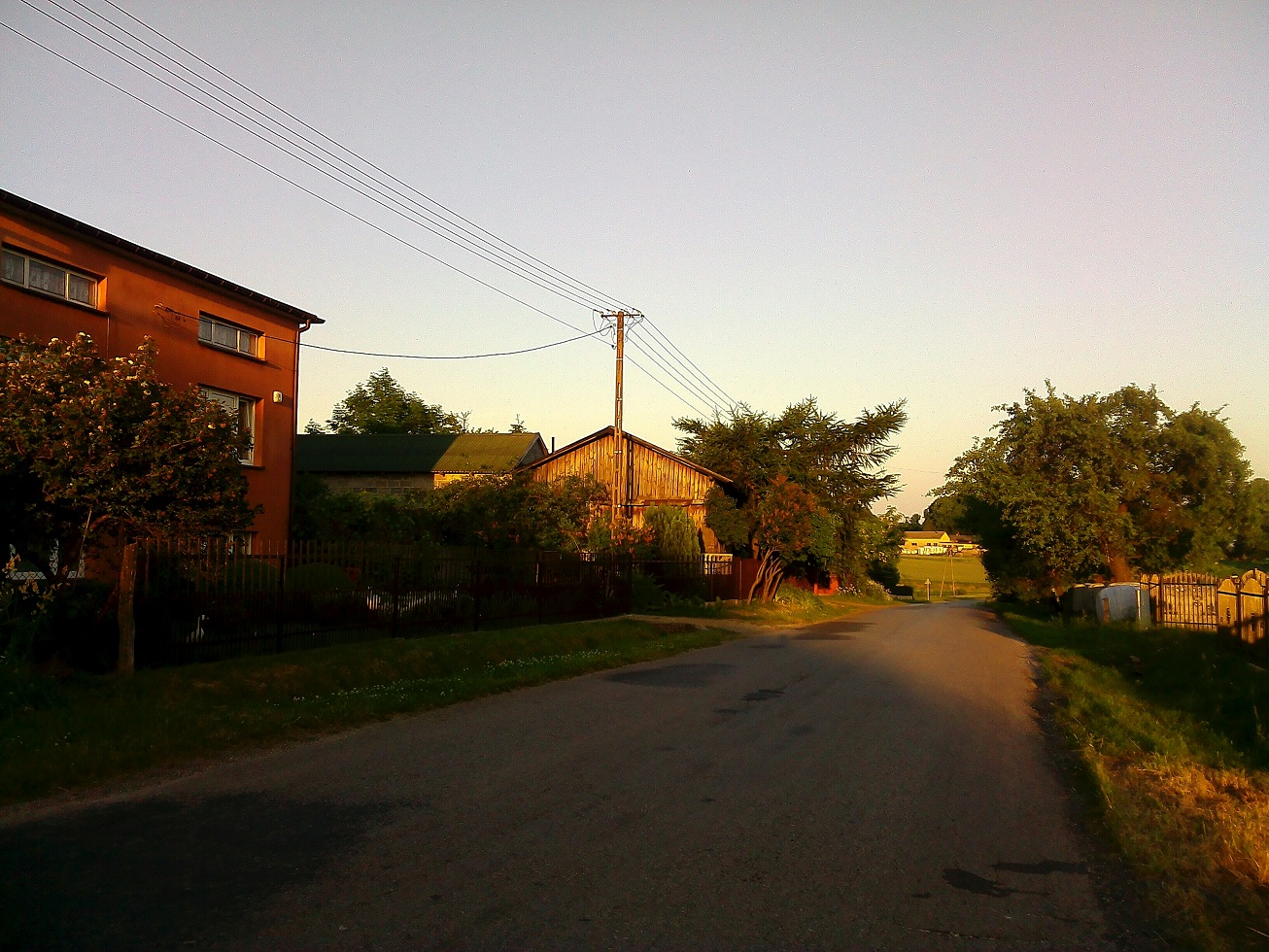

- Location within Poland
- Coordinates: 51°01′17″N 19°34′50″E
- Country: Poland
- Voivodeship: Łódź
- County: Radomsko
- Gmina: Kobiele Wielkie

Łazy [ˈwazɨ] is a village in the administrative district of Gmina Kobiele Wielkie, within Radomsko County, Łódź Voivodeship, in central Poland.
