= Gorgoń, Łódź Voivodeship =

Gorgoń
- Village
- Location within Poland
- Coordinates: 50°58′54″N 19°39′13″E
- Country: Poland
- Voivodeship: Łódź
- County: Radomsko
- Gmina: Kobiele Wielkie

Gorgoń [ˈɡɔrɡɔɲ] is a village in the administrative district of Gmina Kobiele Wielkie, within Radomsko County, Łódź Voivodeship, in central Poland.
