= Przybyszów, Łódź Voivodeship =

Przybyszów
- Village
- Location within Poland
- Coordinates: 51°1′35″N 19°35′35″E
- Country: Poland
- Voivodeship: Łódź
- County: Radomsko
- Gmina: Kobiele Wielkie

Przybyszów [pʂɨˈbɨʂuf] is a village in the administrative district of Gmina Kobiele Wielkie, within Radomsko County, Łódź Voivodeship, in central Poland.
