= Orzechówek, Radomsko County =

Orzechówek
- Village
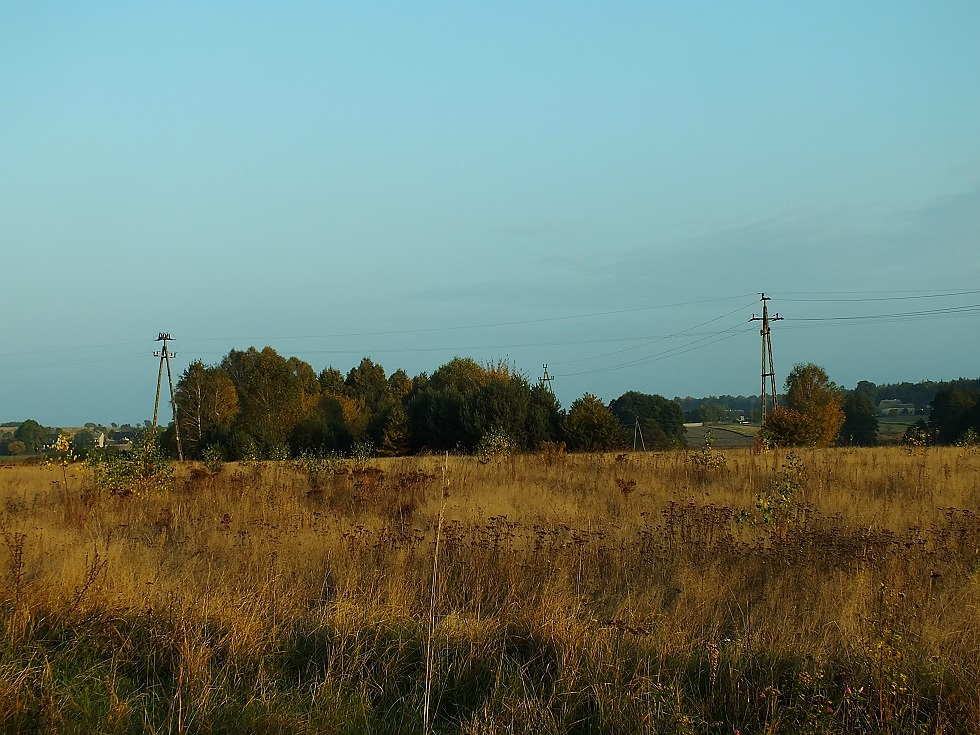

- Location within Poland
- Coordinates: 51°1′47″N 19°31′36″E
- Country: Poland
- Voivodeship: Łódź
- County: Radomsko
- Gmina: Kobiele Wielkie

Orzechówek [ɔʐɛˈxuvɛk] is a village in the administrative district of Gmina Kobiele Wielkie, within Radomsko County, Łódź Voivodeship, in central Poland.
