= Lazy Branch =

American stream in Missouri

Coordinates: 39°10′56″N 94°20′01″W

Lazy Branch is a stream in Jackson County in the U.S. state of Missouri. It is a tributary of the Missouri River.

Lazy Branch was named by W.C. Dingle, because he "thought the settlers along the stream were lazy because they preferred to hunt and run horses rather than work."

== See also ==
- List of rivers of Missouri
