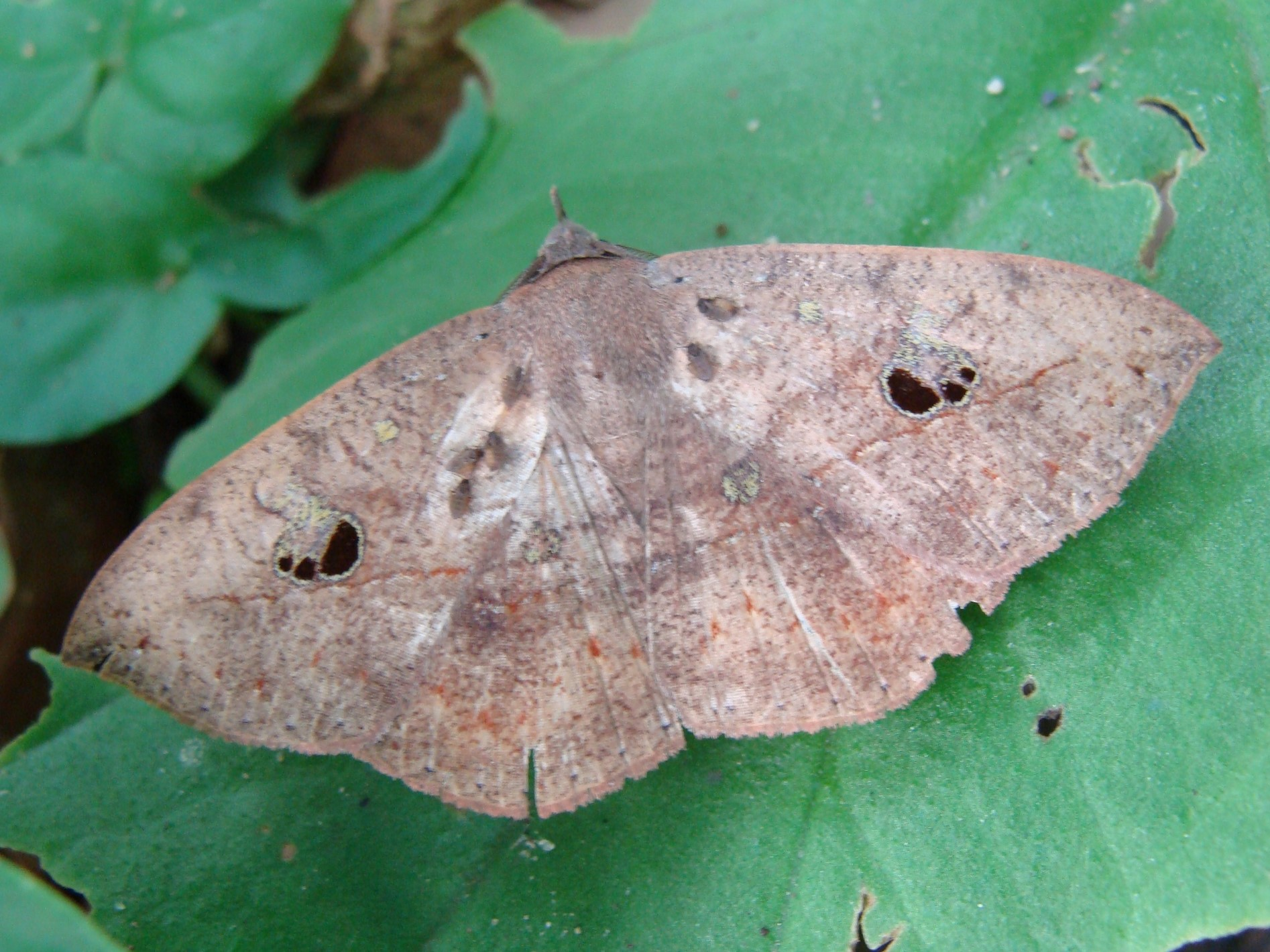
- Gorgone fellearis

Scientific classification
- Kingdom: Animalia
- Phylum: Arthropoda
- Clade: Pancrustacea
- Class: Insecta
- Order: Lepidoptera
- Superfamily: Noctuoidea
- Family: Erebidae
- Subfamily: Calpinae
- Genus: Gorgone; Hübner, 1821

Synonyms
- Apistis Hübner, 1823; Gorgonia Hübner, 1825; Apistus Agassiz, 1847; Hypenaria Guenée, 1852; Plaxia Guenée, 1852

= Gorgone (moth) =

Genus of moths

Gorgone is a genus of moths in the family Erebidae. The genus was erected by Jacob Hübner in 1821.

== Species ==
- Gorgone augusta Stoll, 1782
- Gorgone brachygonia Hampson, 1926
- Gorgone drusilla Möschler, 1880
- Gorgone fellearis Hübner, 1823
- Gorgone hilaris Walker, 1865
- Gorgone macarea Cramer, 1777
- Gorgone mormon Felder, 1874
- Gorgone ortilia Stoll, 1781
- Gorgone pyrochila Butler, 1879
- Gorgone superba Möschler, 1880
- Gorgone umbratica Dognin, 1912
