= Gorgon (surname) =

Gorgon is a surname. It may refer to:

- Agnieszka Gorgoń-Komor (born 1970), Polish politician
- Alexander Gorgon (born 1988), Polish-Austrian footballer
- Barbara Gorgoń (1936–2020), Polish luger
- Jerzy Gorgoń (born 1949), Polish footballer
