= Gorgon of Rhodes =

Ancient Greek historian

Gorgon of Rhodes (Greek: Γόργων) was an ancient Greek historian of Rhodes. He is the author of an historical work Περί τῶν ἐν Ῥόδῳ θυσιῶν, and of Scholia on Pindar.

== Sources ==
- Smith, Philip (1867). "Gorgon". In Smith, William (ed.). A Dictionary of Greek and Roman Biography and Mythology. Vol. 2. Boston, MA: Little, Brown, and Company. p. 286.
