= Historical coins and banknotes of Poland =

This is a list of historical coins and banknotes from Poland.

== Coins ==
=== Pre-20th Century ===
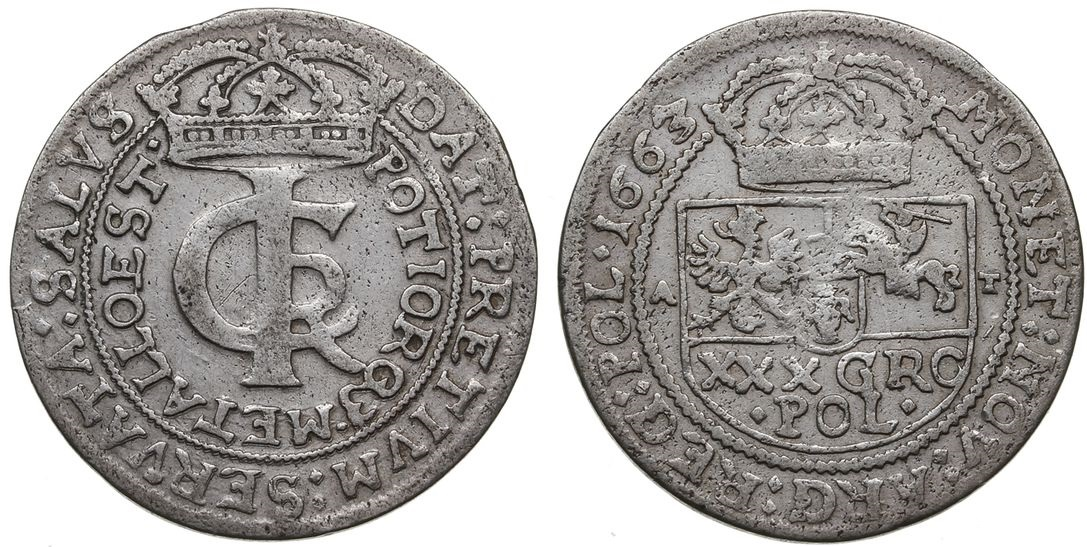
Tymf - złotówka 1663

Pre 20th Century)
Image		Value	Technical parameters				Description			Date of		
Obverse	Reverse	Value	Diameter	Thickness	Mass	Composition	Edge	Obverse	Reverse	first minting	issue	withdrawal
Coins (1815-1841)
		2 zł	26.0 mm	? mm	6.2 g	868‰ silver	milled	None	ЧИСТАГО СЕРЕБРА 1 ЗОЛ 25½ ДОЛИ, 30 КОПѢЕКЪ, 2 ZŁOTE, year of minting.	1834	1834	1841
		5 zł	33.0 mm	? mm	15.6 g	868‰ silver	milled	mint mark, ЧИСТАГО СЕРЕБРА 3 ЗОЛОТНИКА 15 3/4 ДОЛЕЙ	3/4 РУБЛЯ, 5 złot, year of minting	1833	1833	1841
Images might not actually be to scale...
These images are to scale at 2.5 pixels per millimetre. For table standards, see the coin specification table.

=== 20th-century and interwar ===
1924 - See Dziennik Ustaw 1924-045

== Banknotes ==
=== Before the 20th century ===
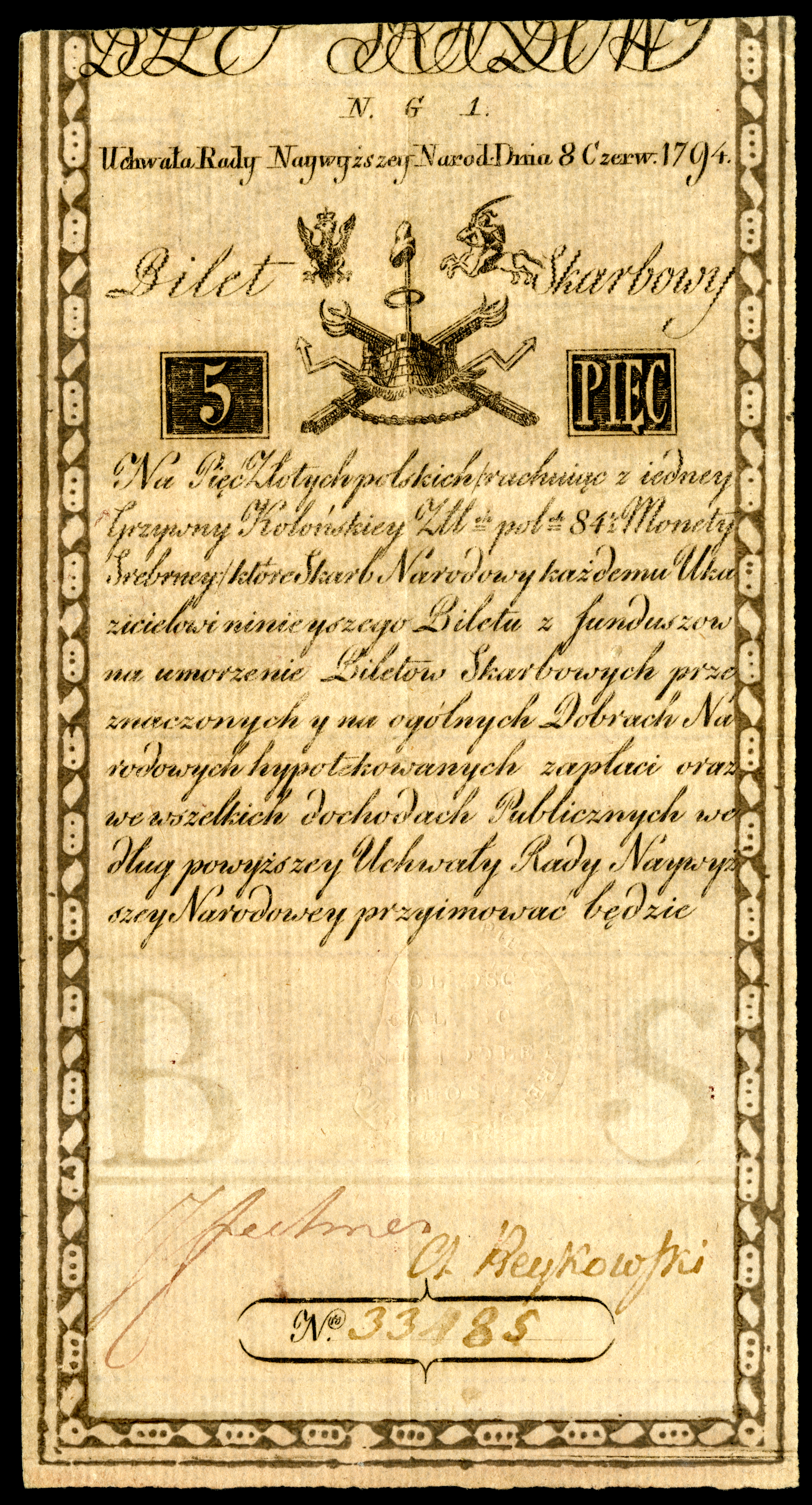
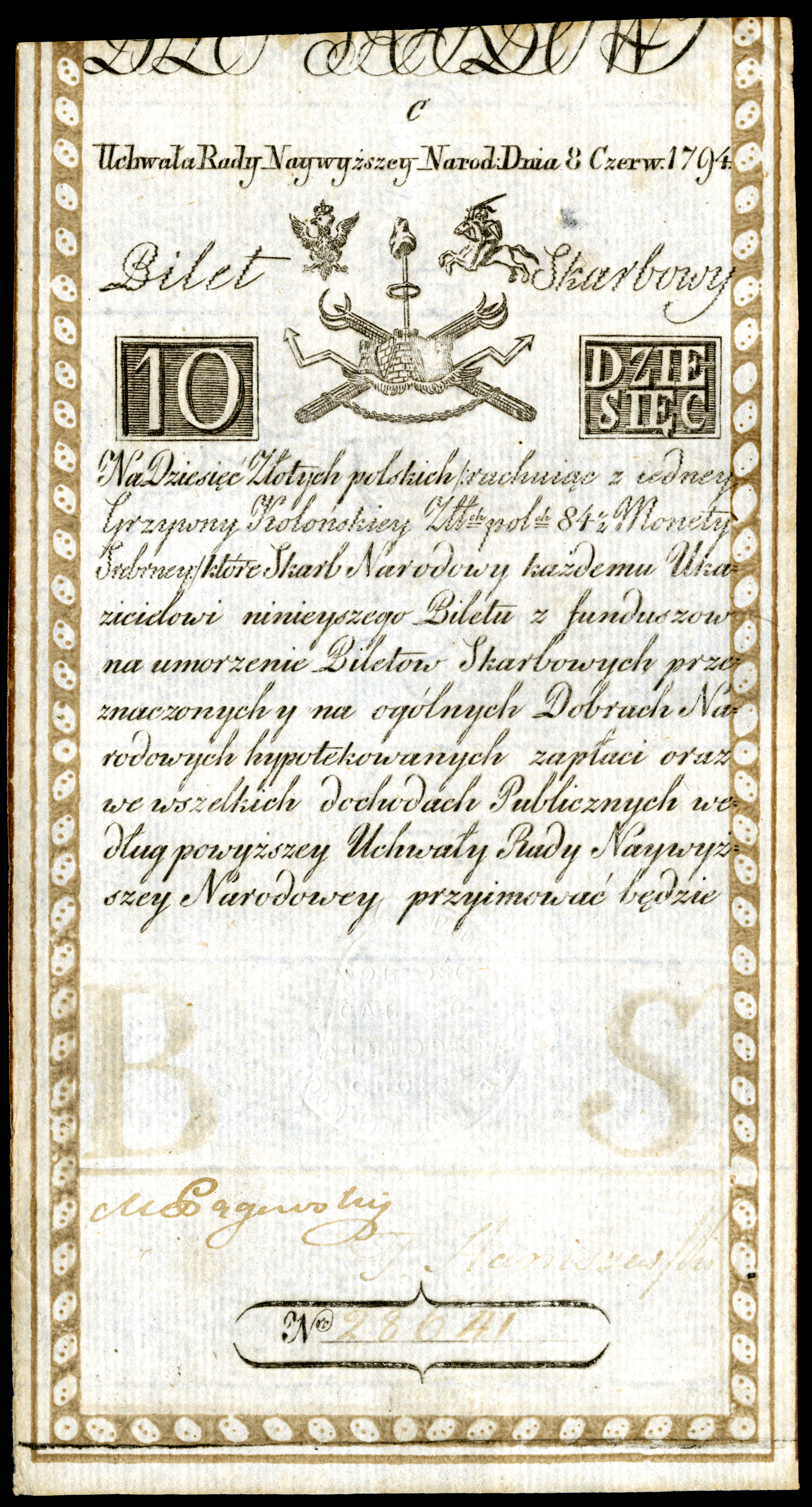
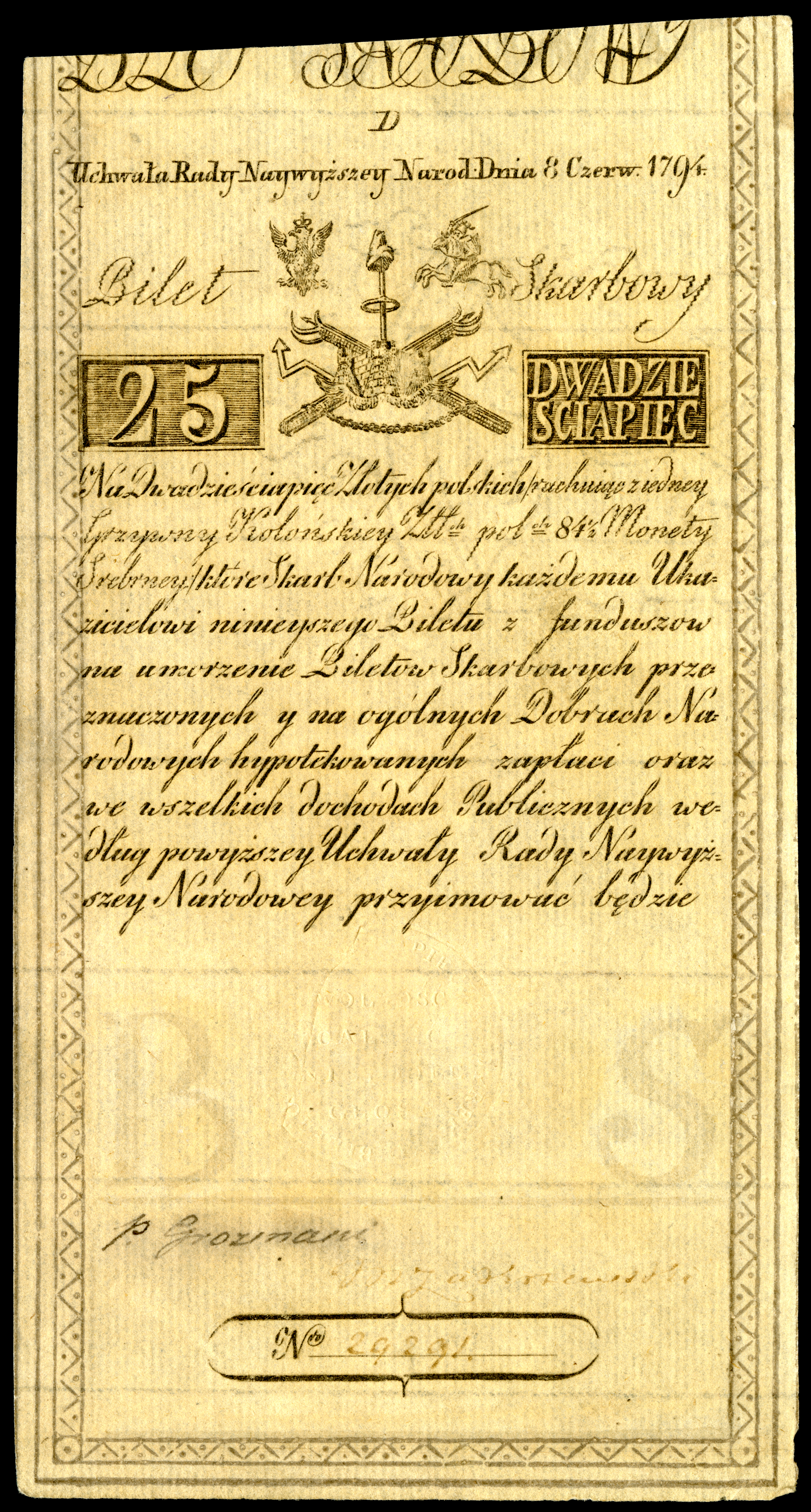
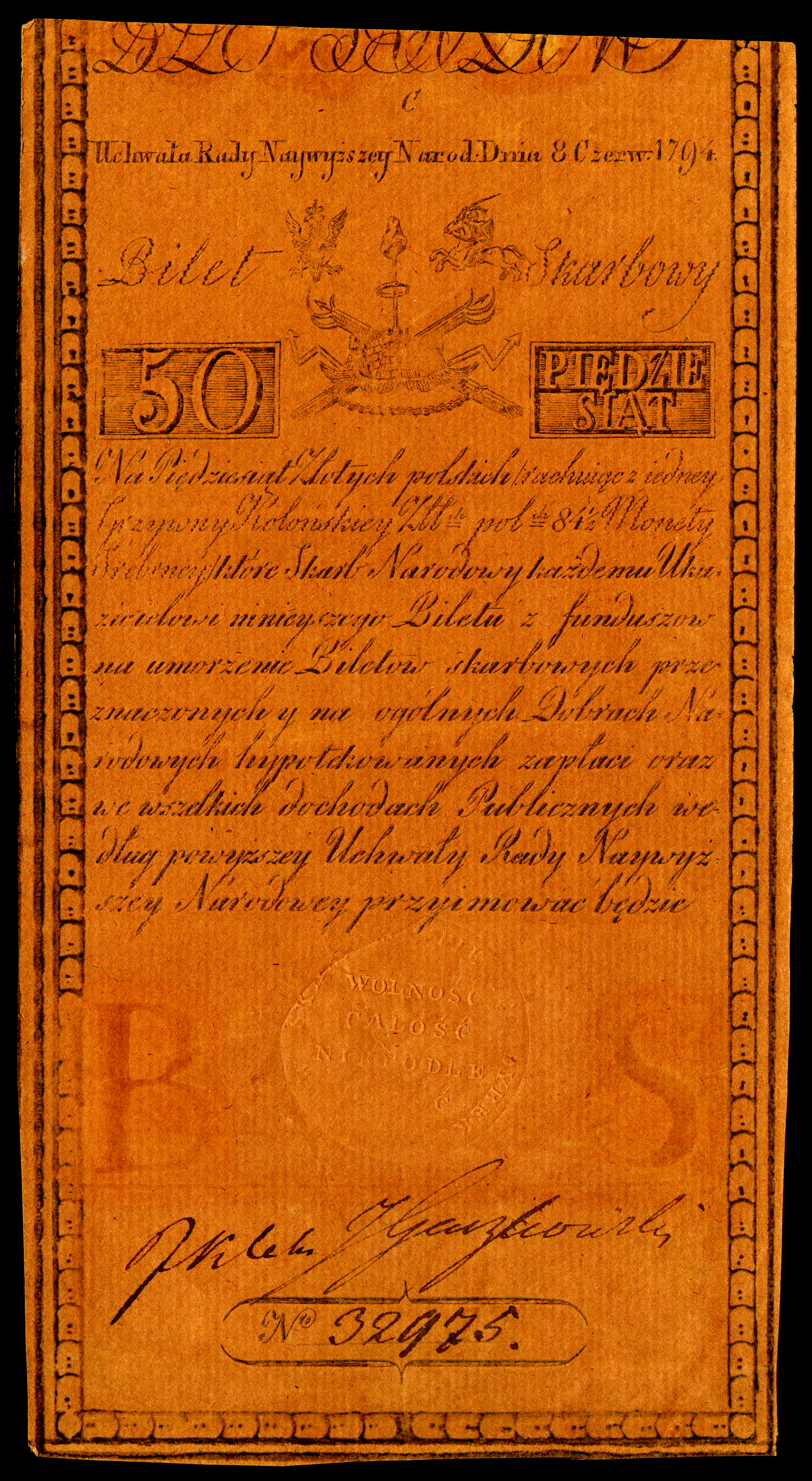
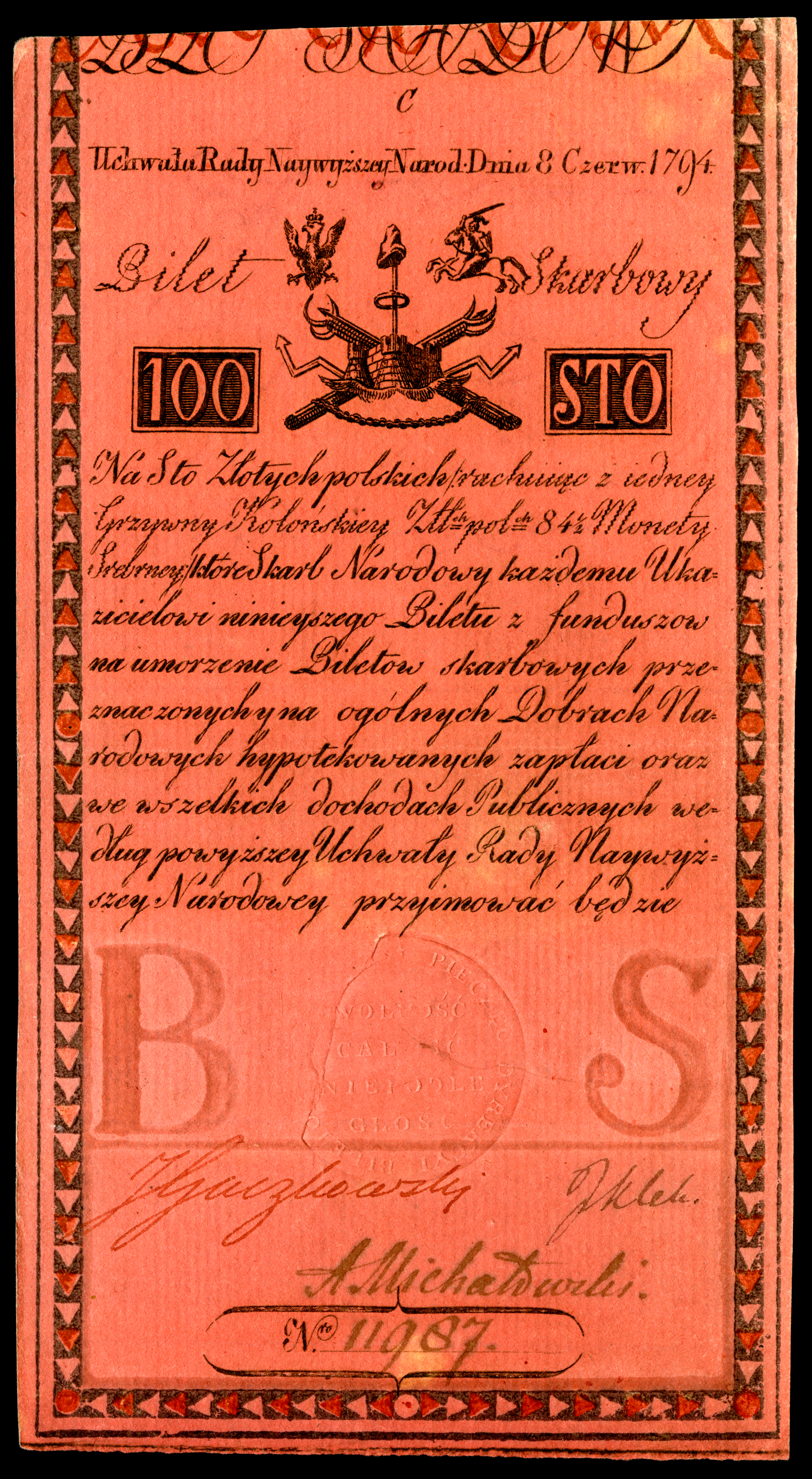
The Polish–Lithuanian Commonwealth first issued złotych banknotes in 1794 under the authority of Tadeusz Kościuszko. The 5, 10, 25, 50, and 100 złotych are depicted above. A 500 and 1,000 złotych were issued but are very rare.

Polish coins and banknotes
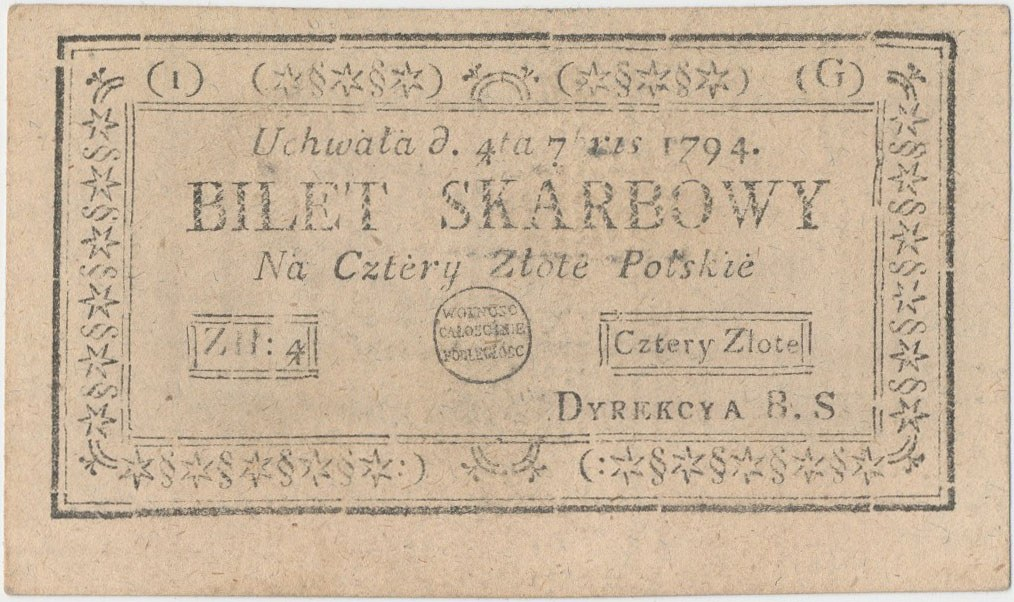
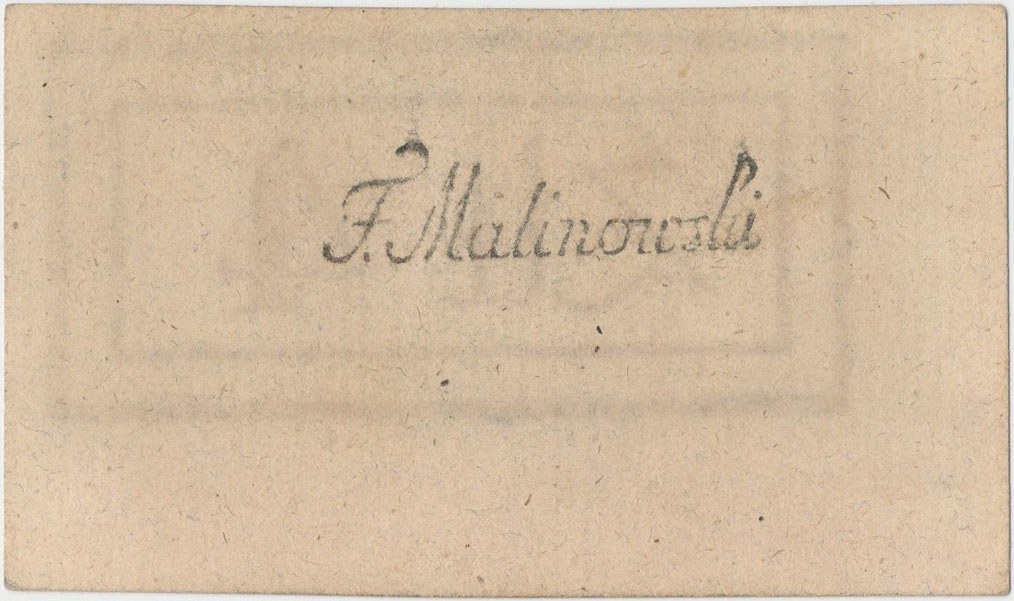
Unit (ZŁ)	Obverse	Reverse
Coins (Kingdom of Poland)
Banknotes (Polish-Lithuanian Commonwealth)
4 zł
Banknotes (Duchy of Warsaw)
Banknotes (1850-1917)

=== 20th-century and interwar ===
Polish coins and banknotes
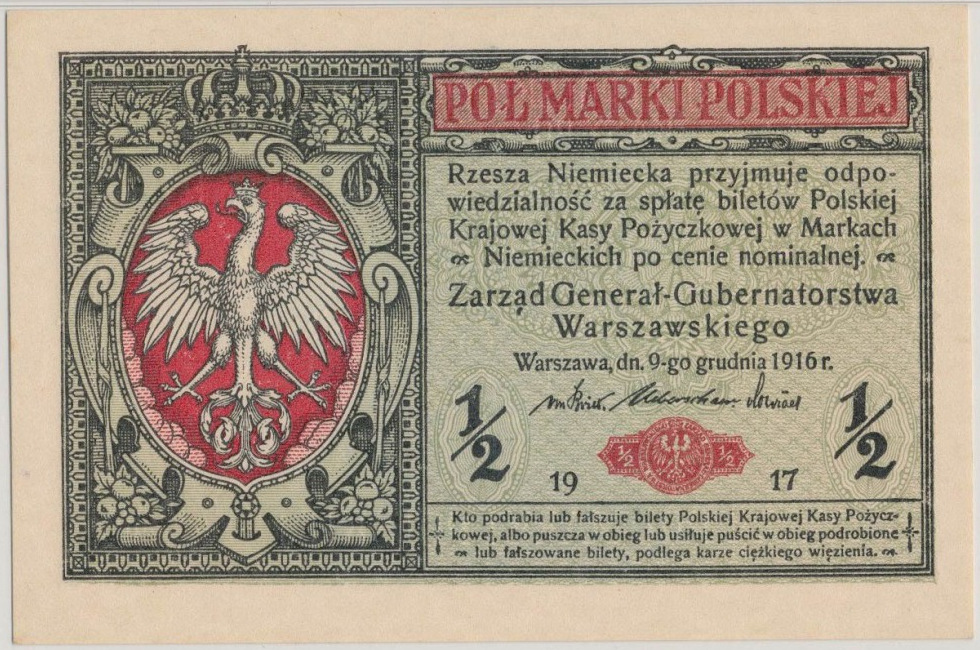
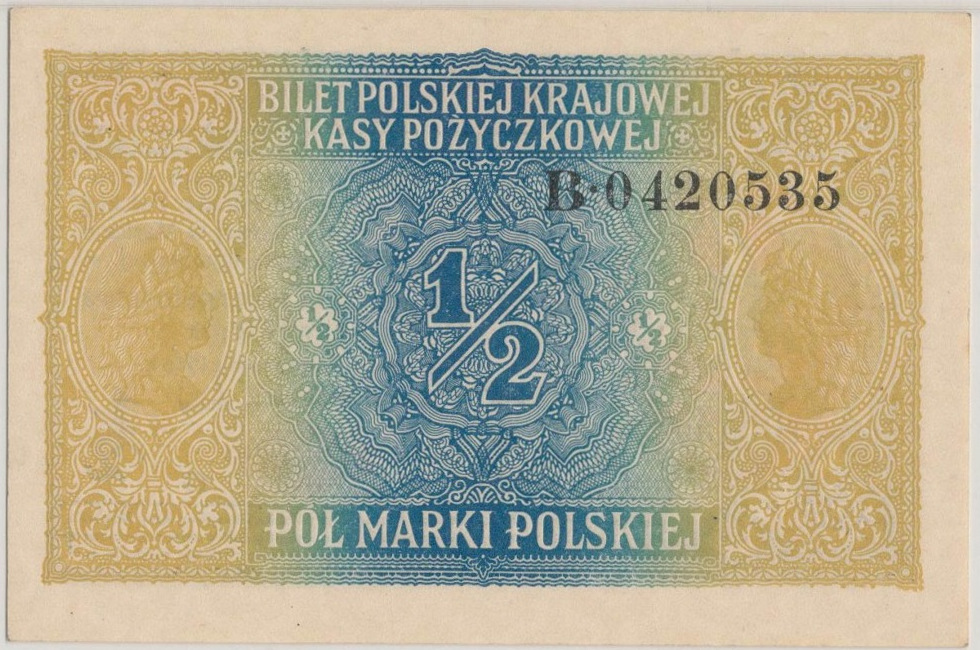
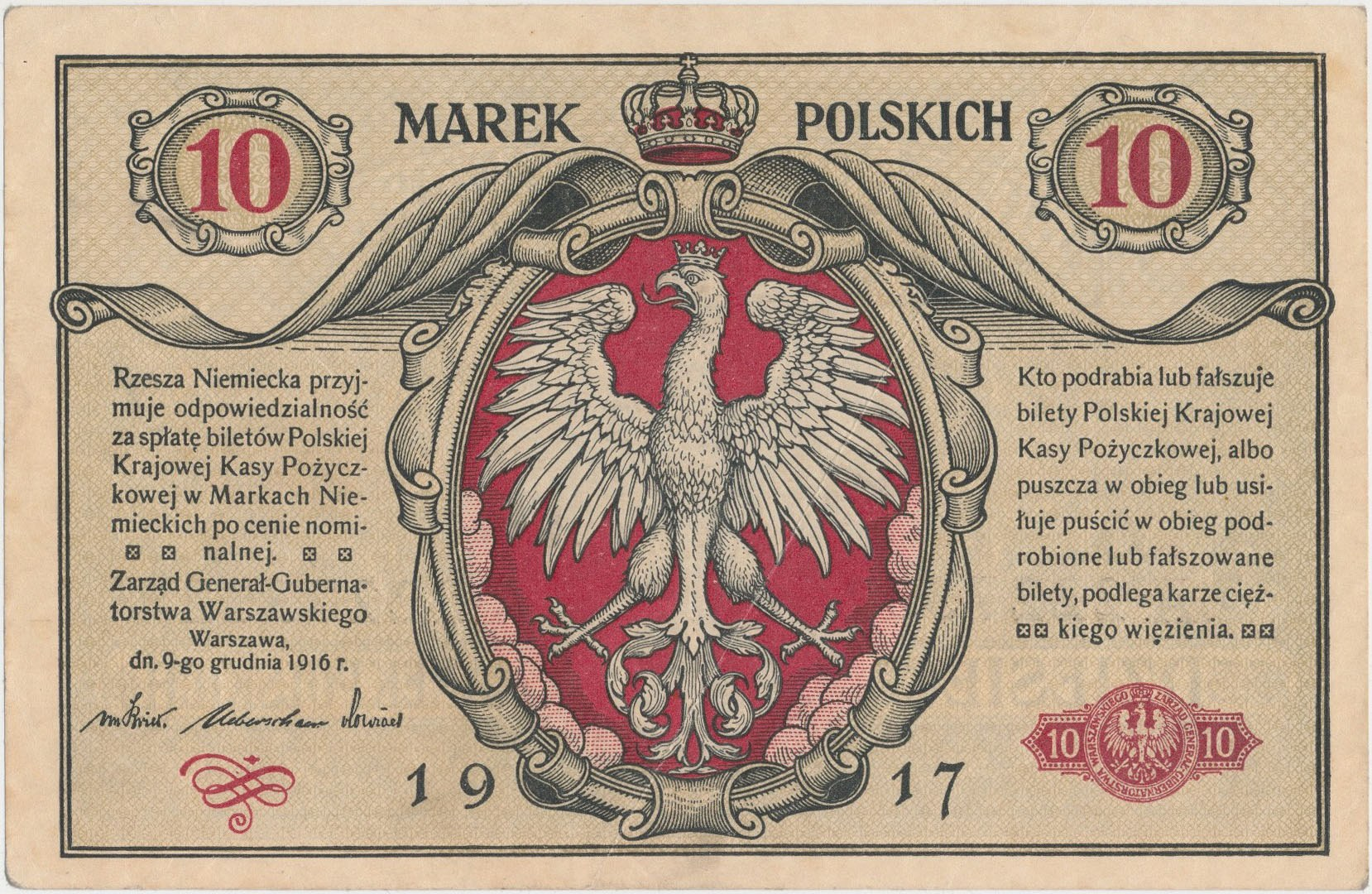
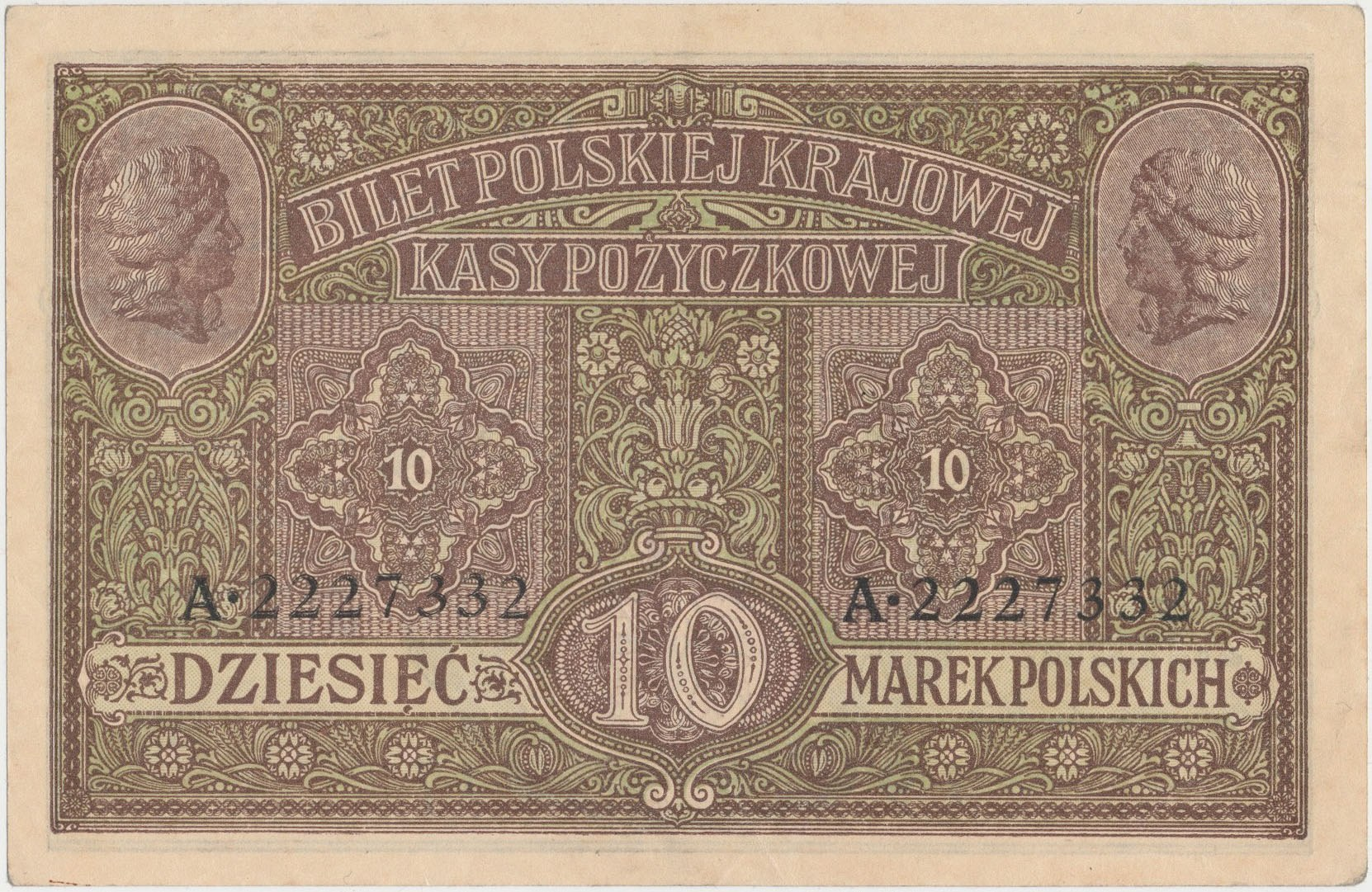
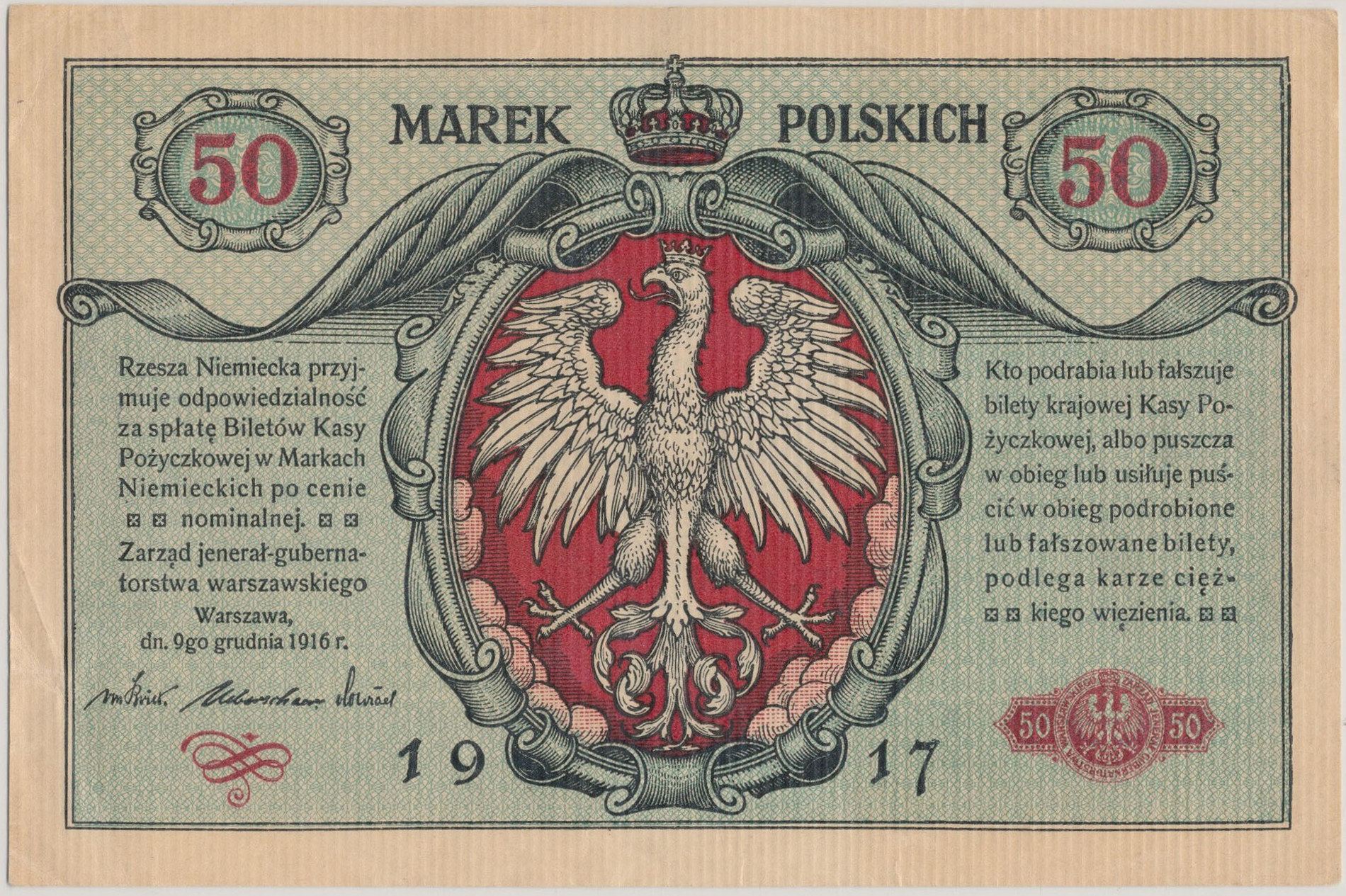
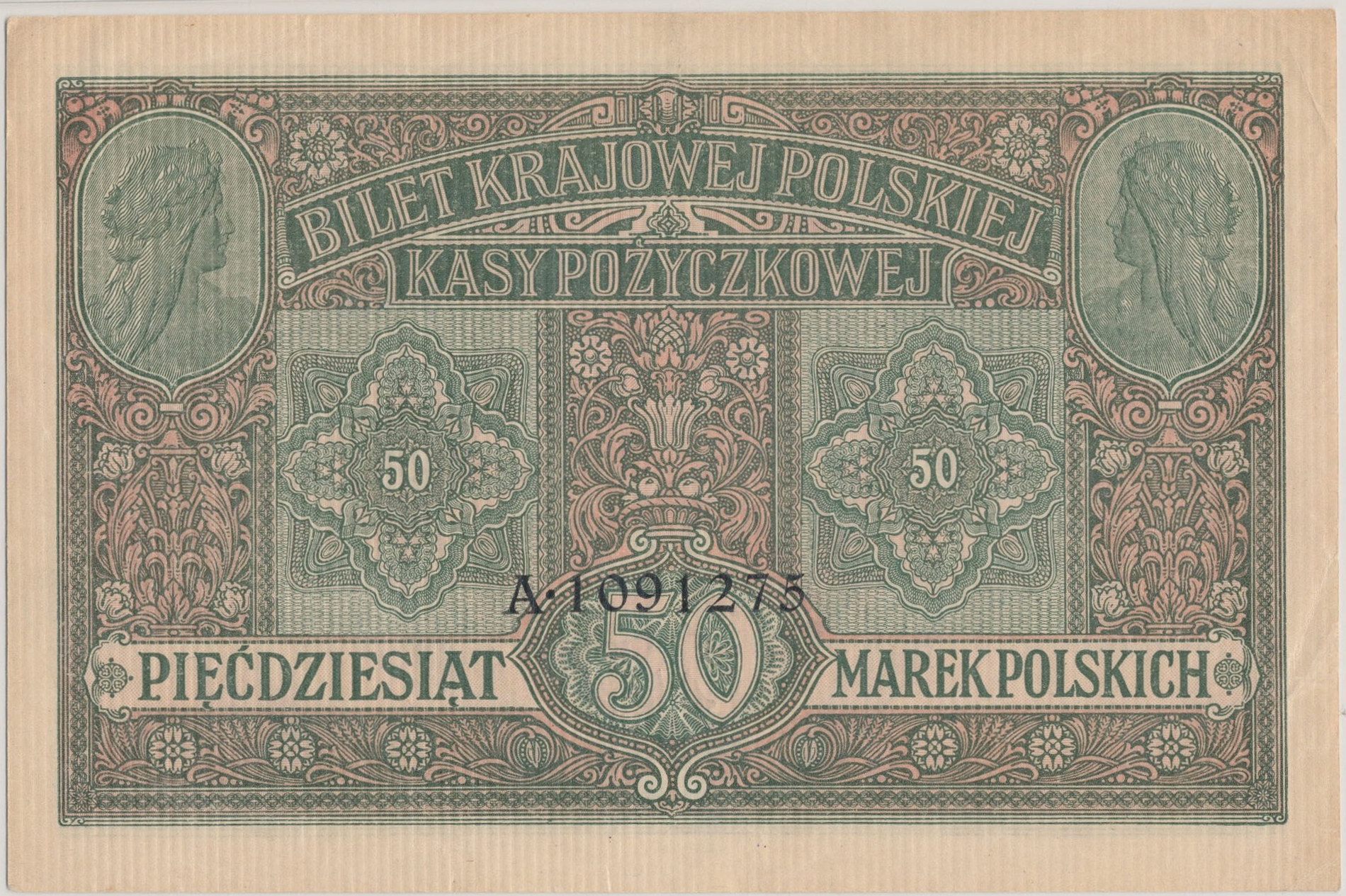
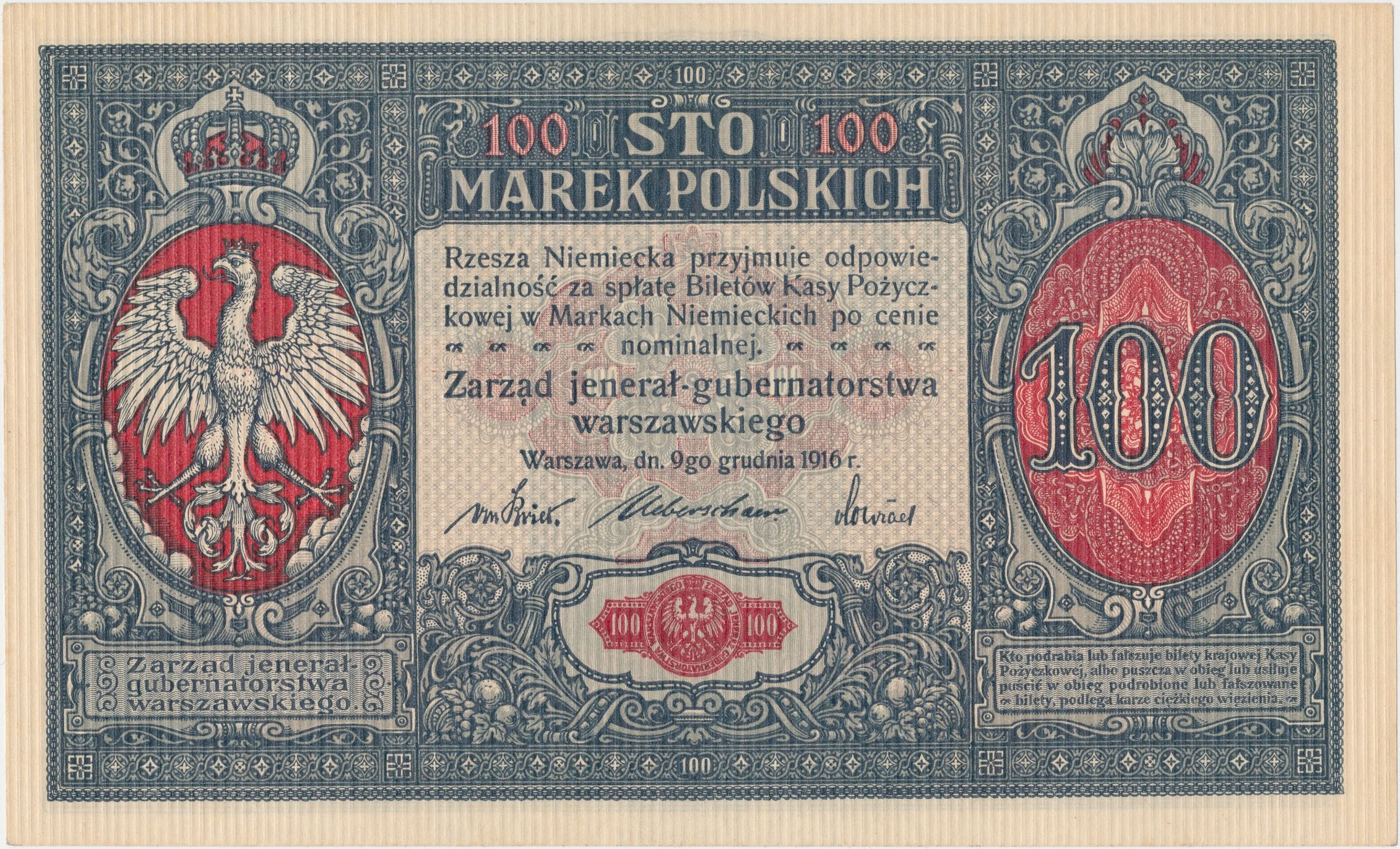
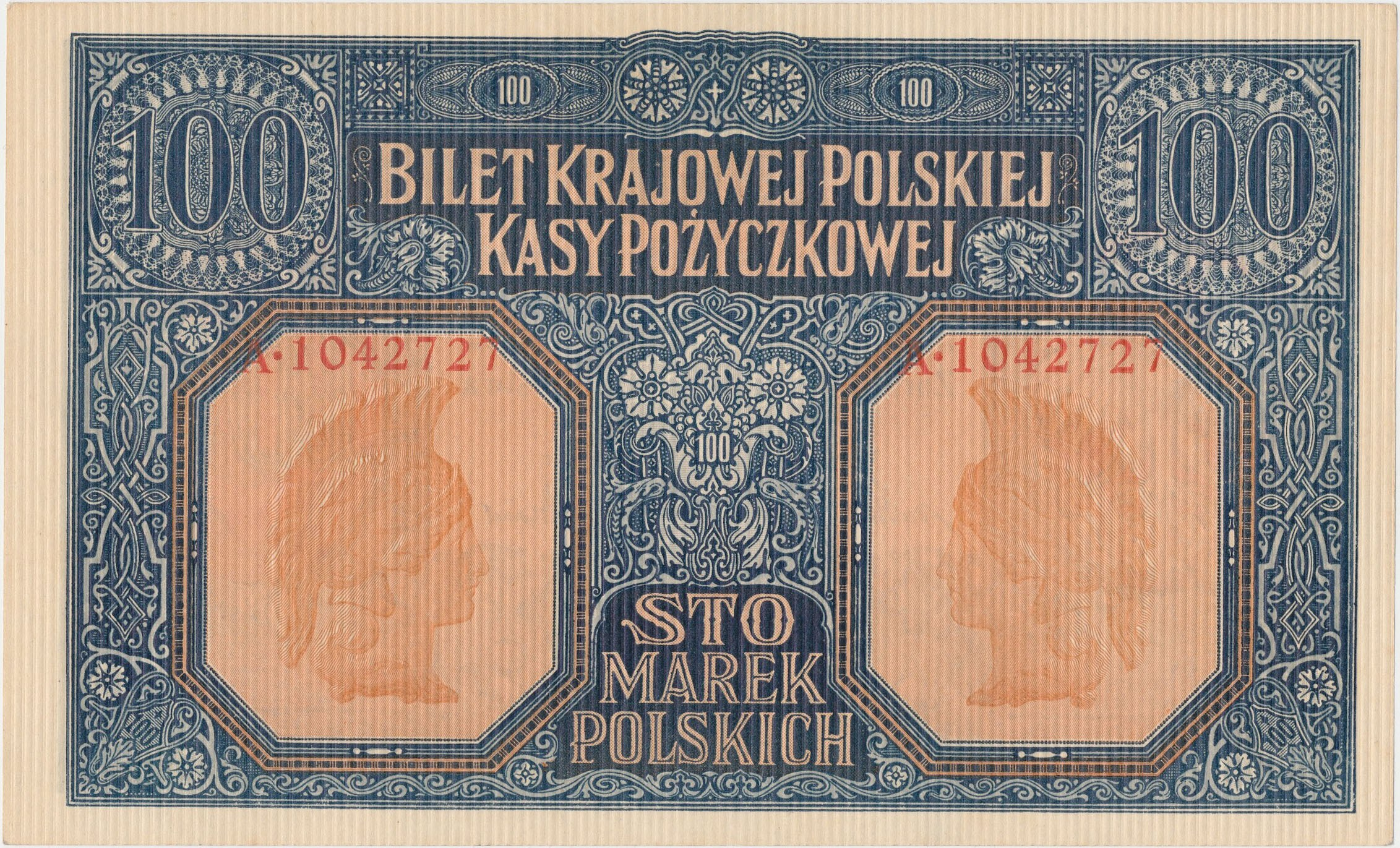
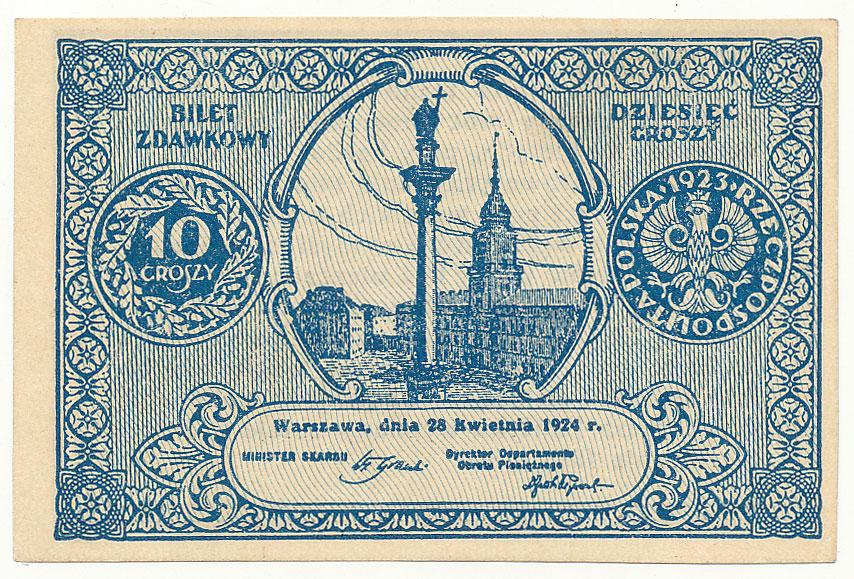
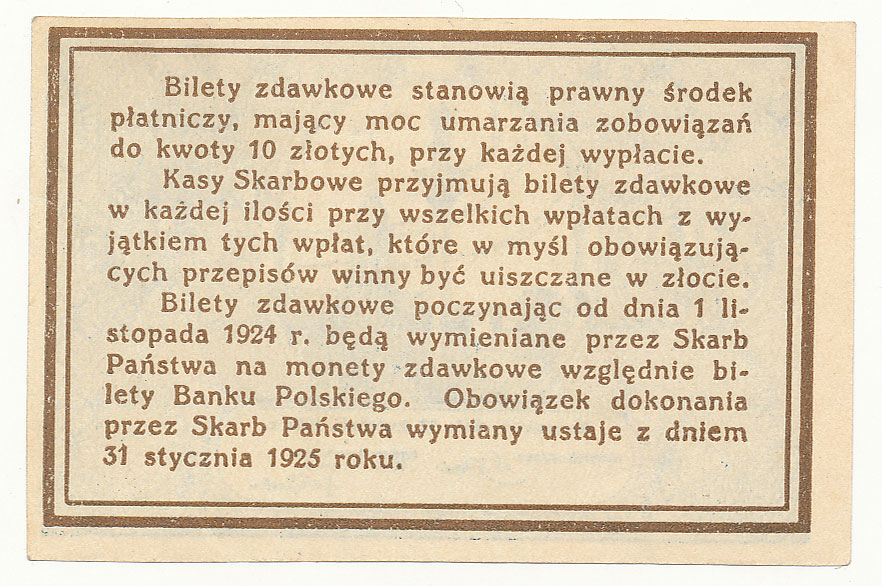
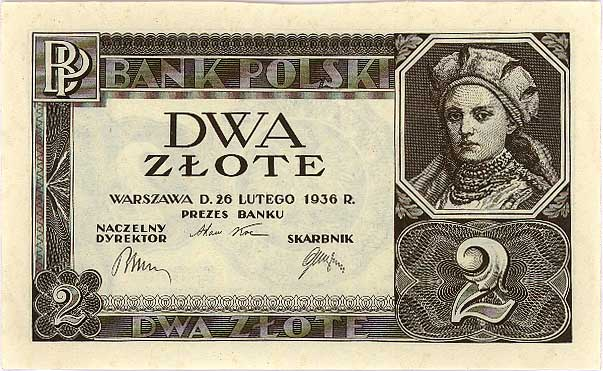
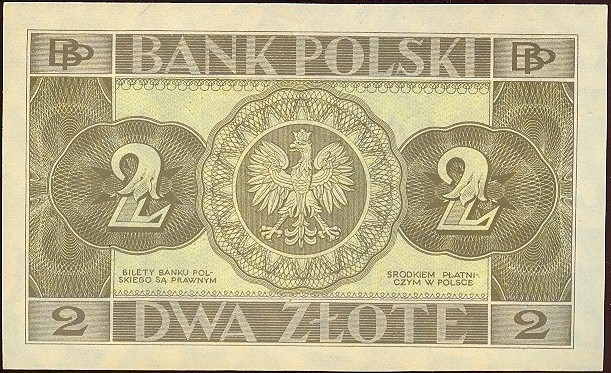
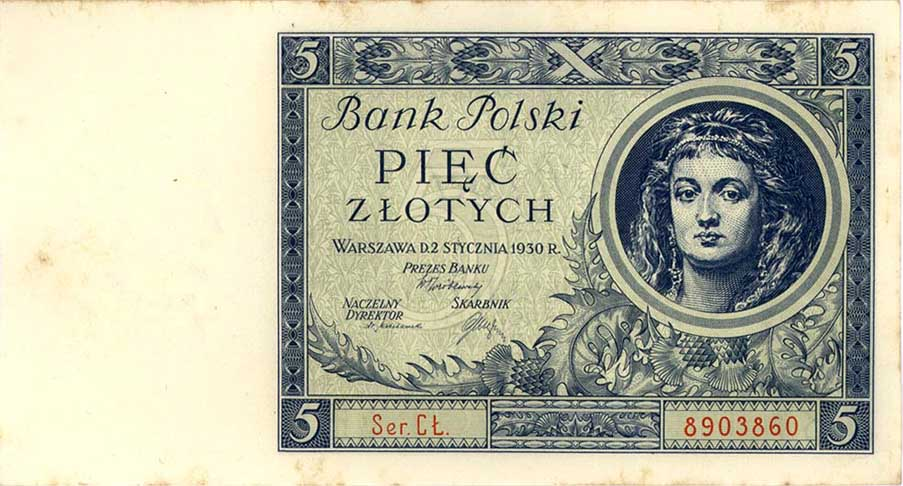
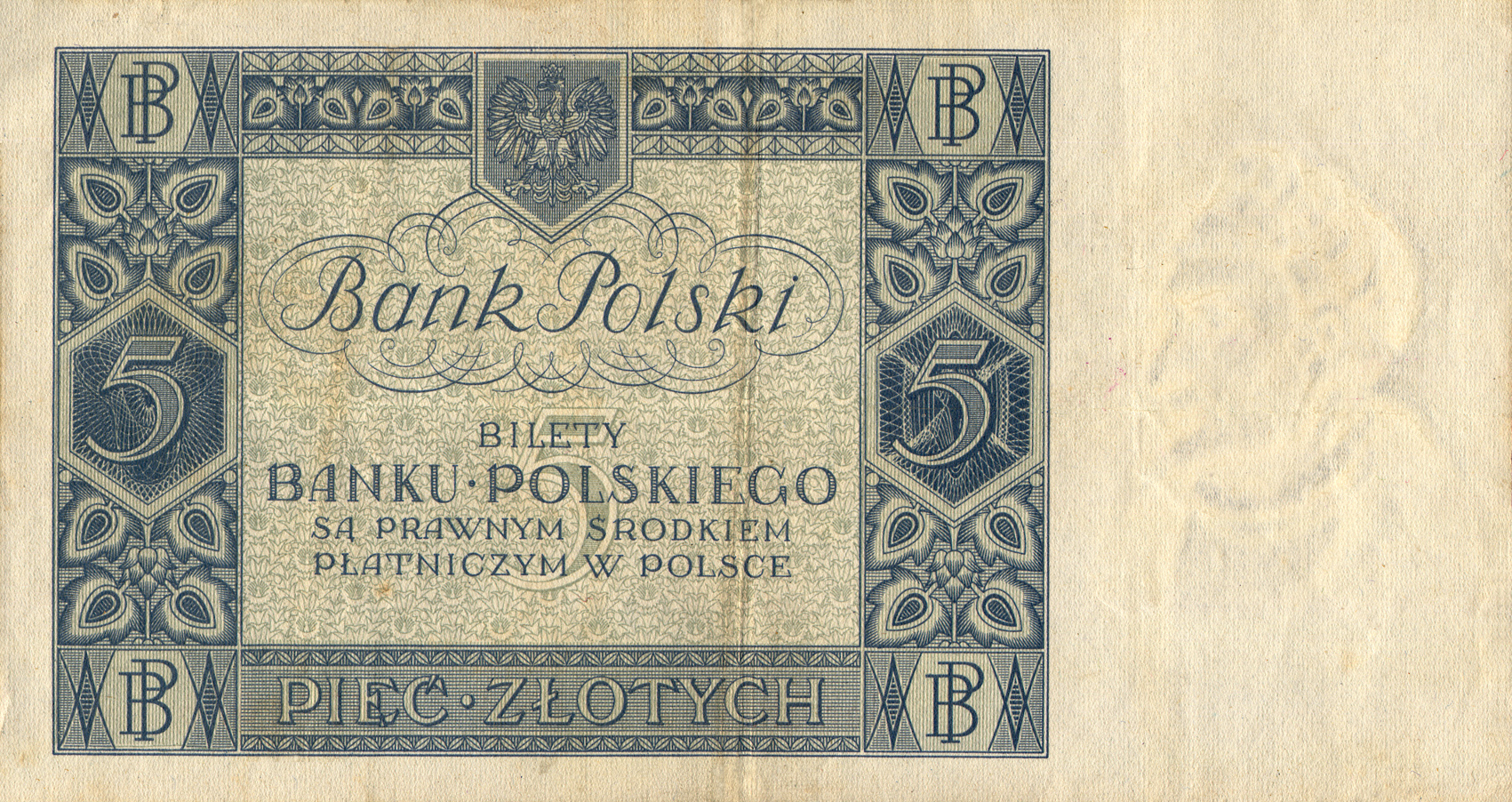
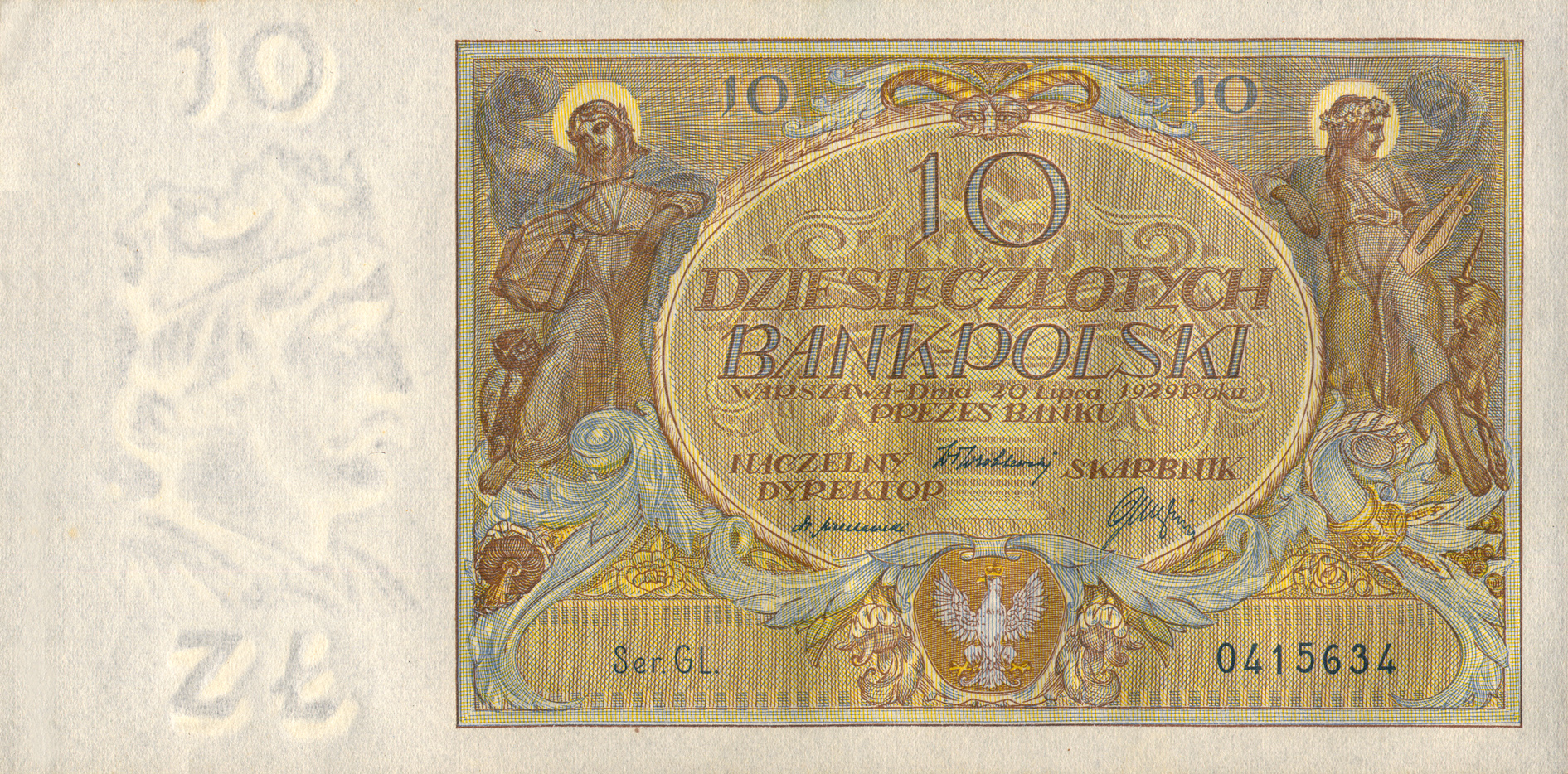
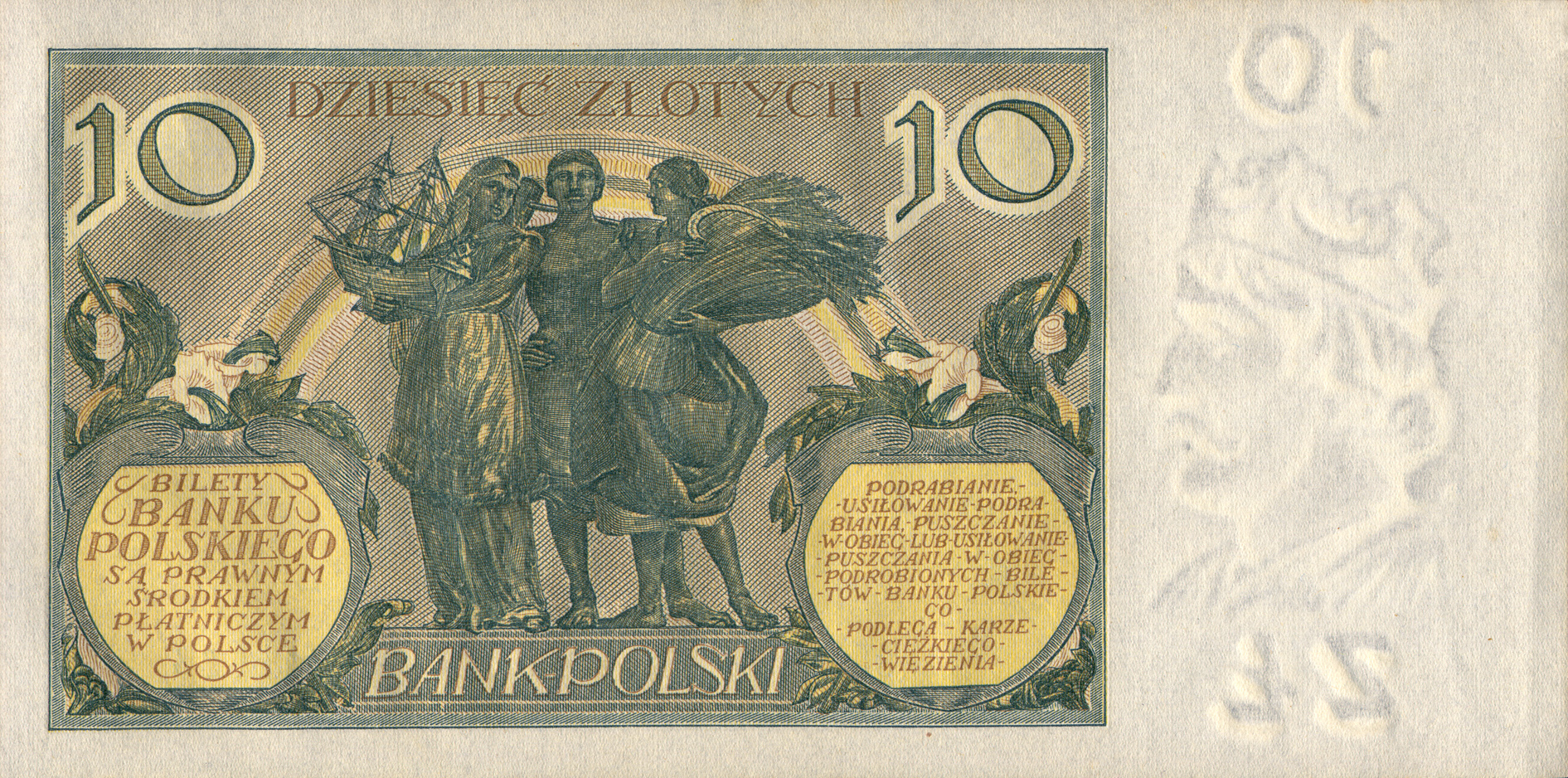
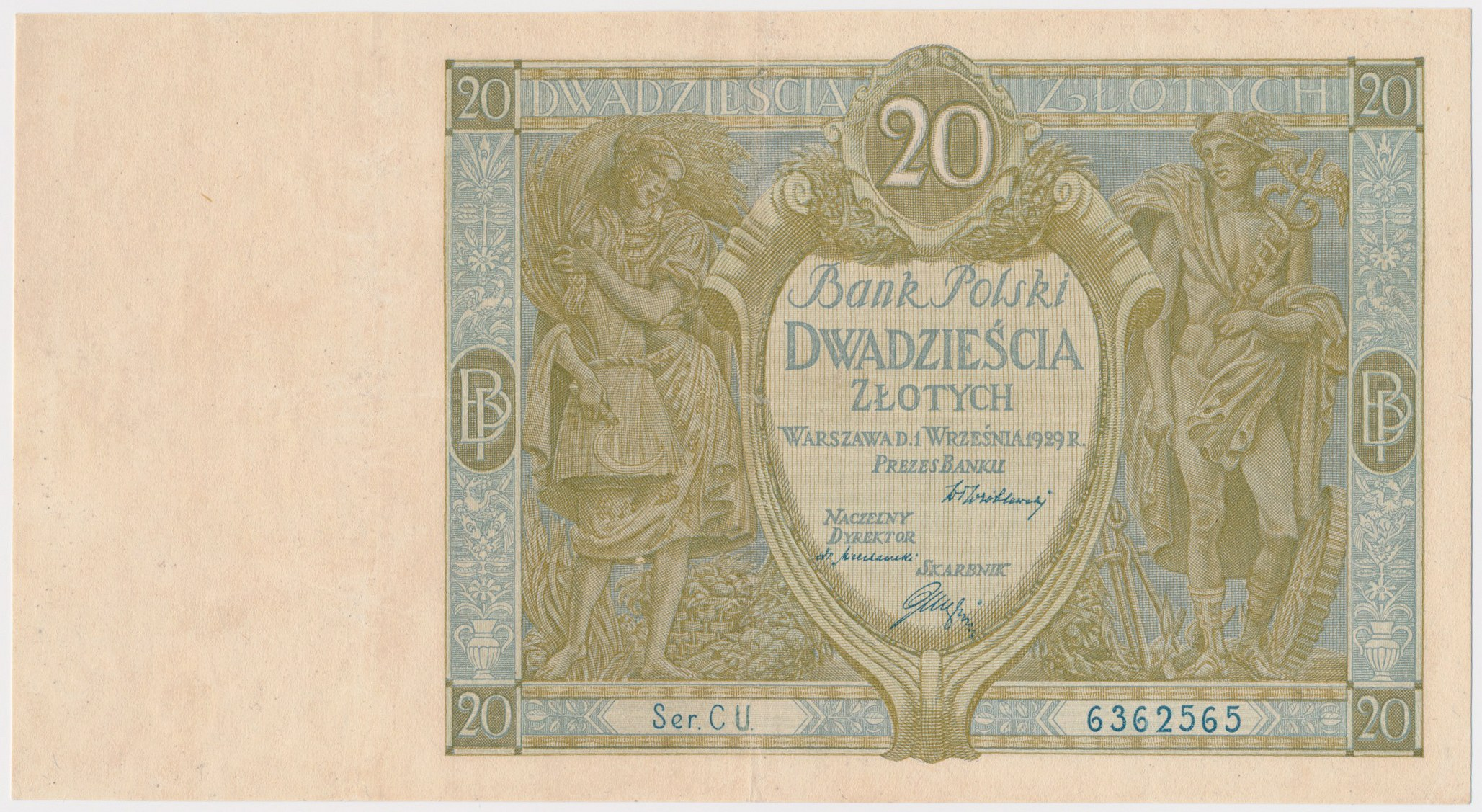
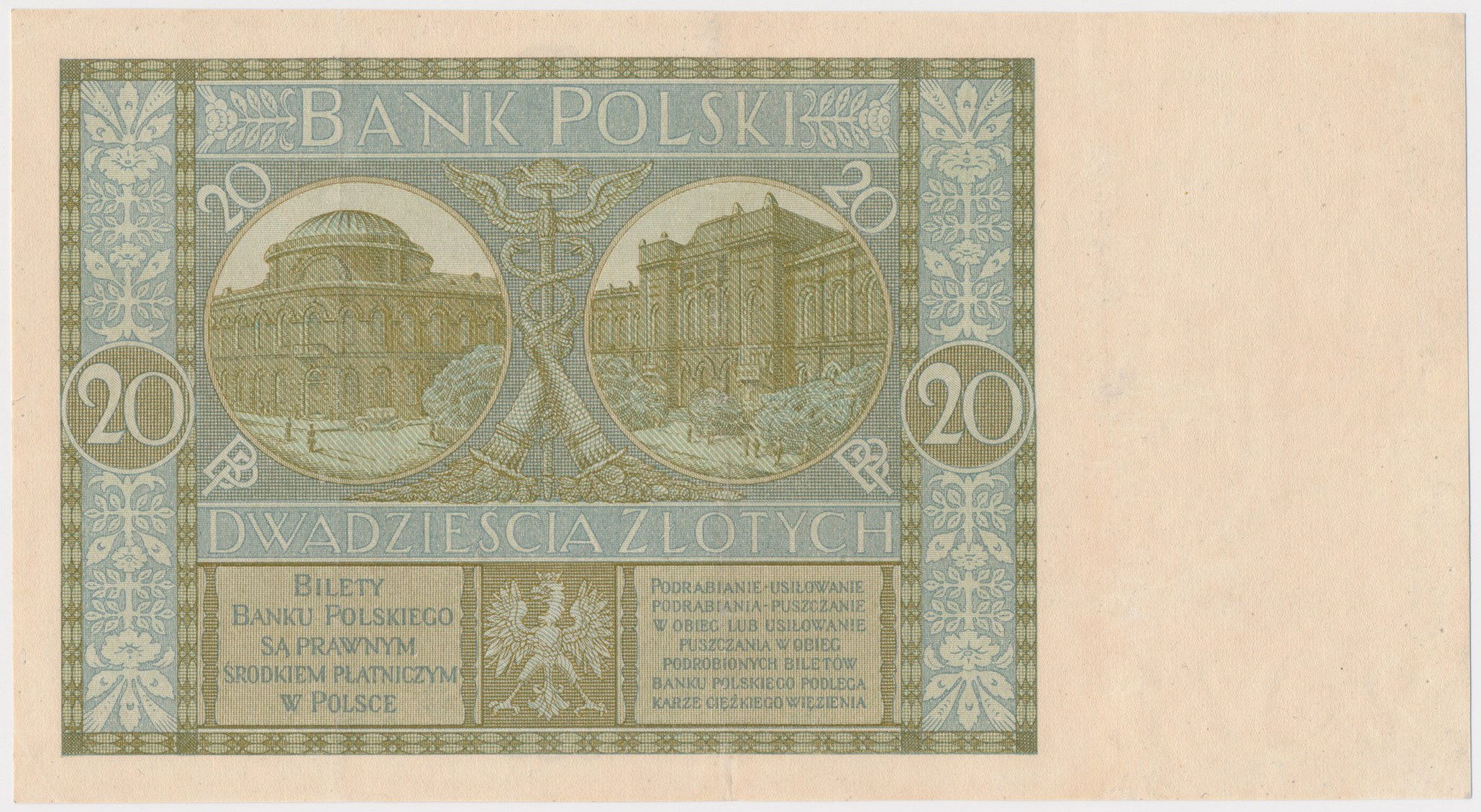
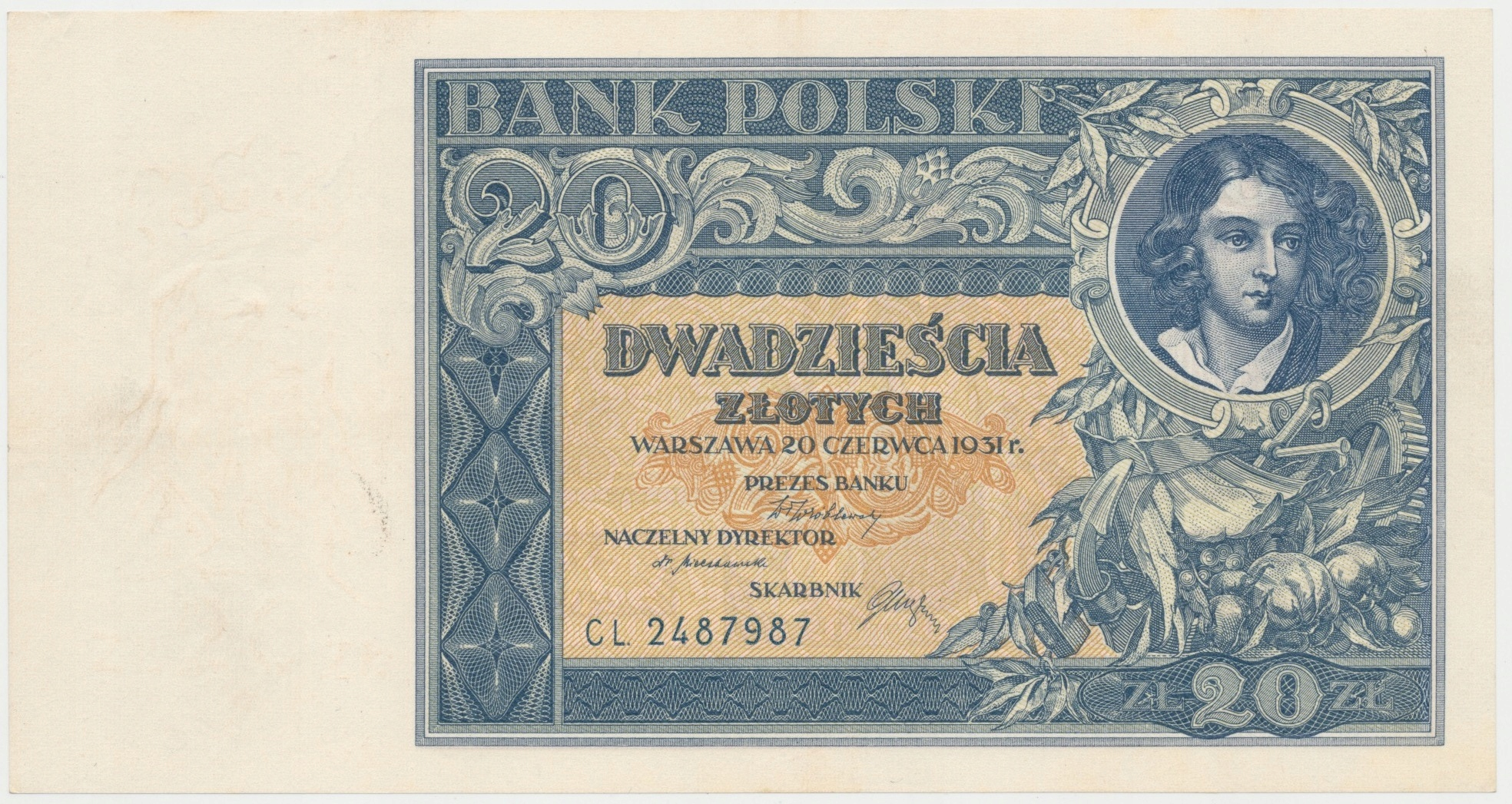
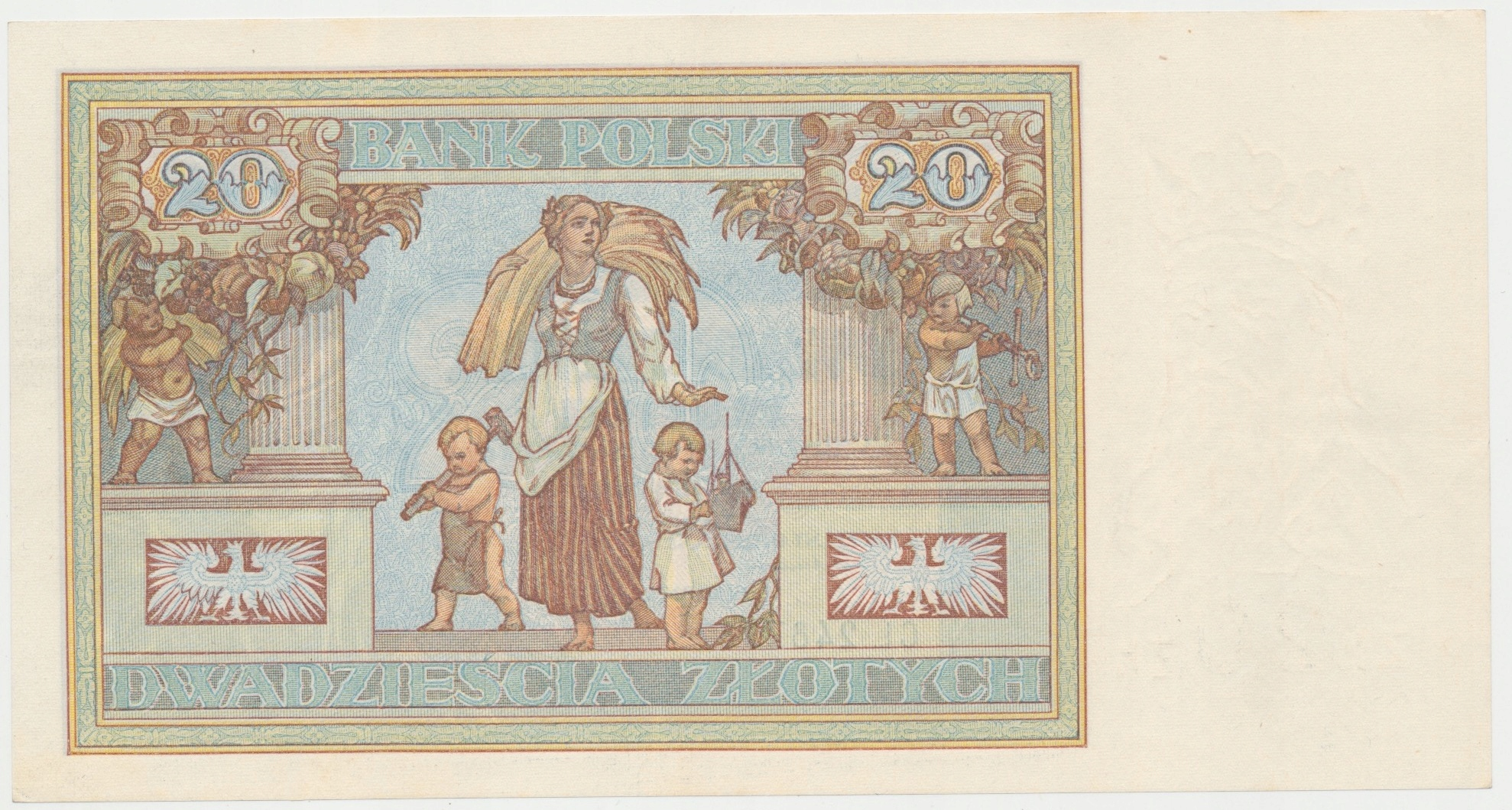
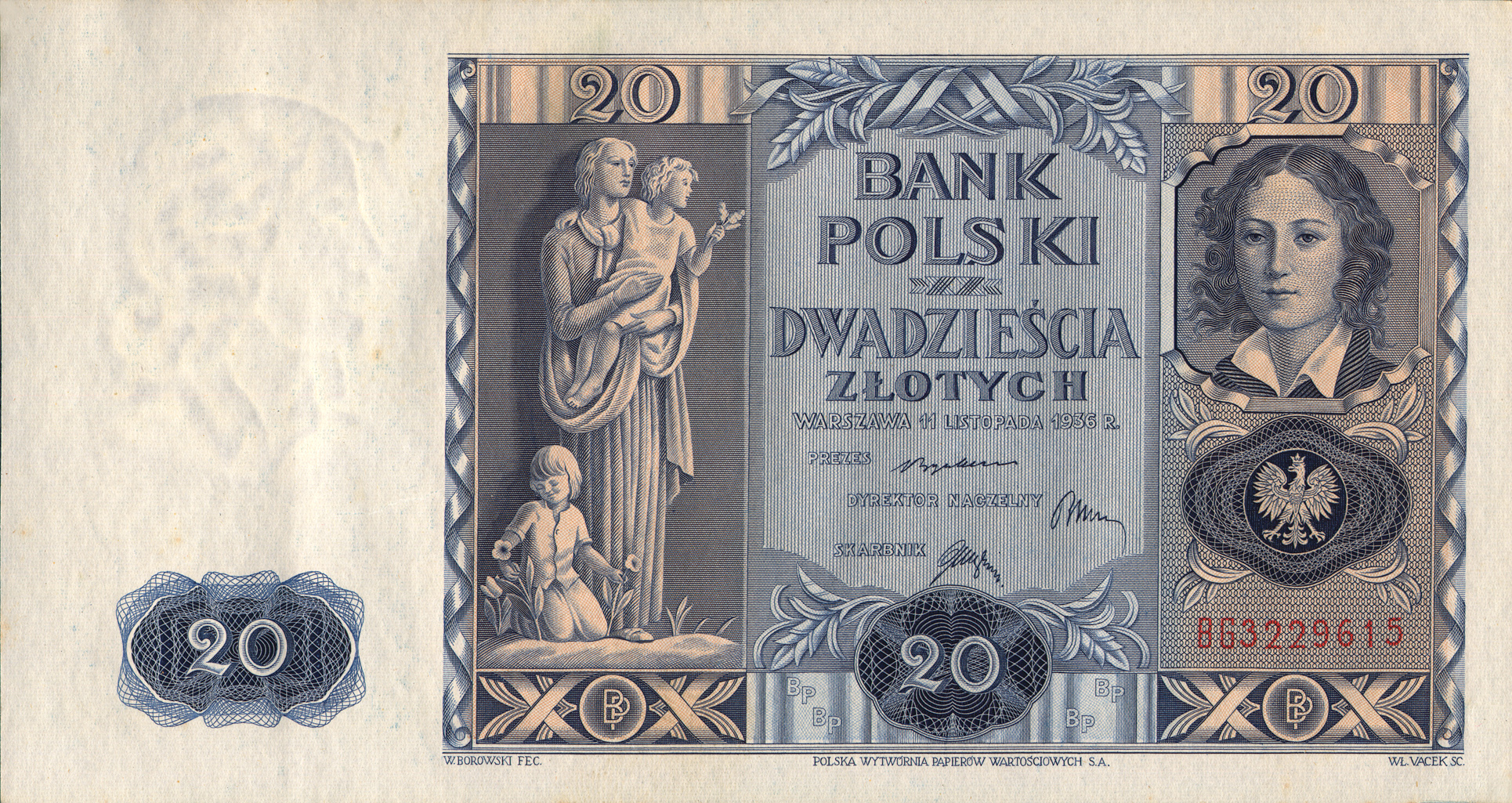
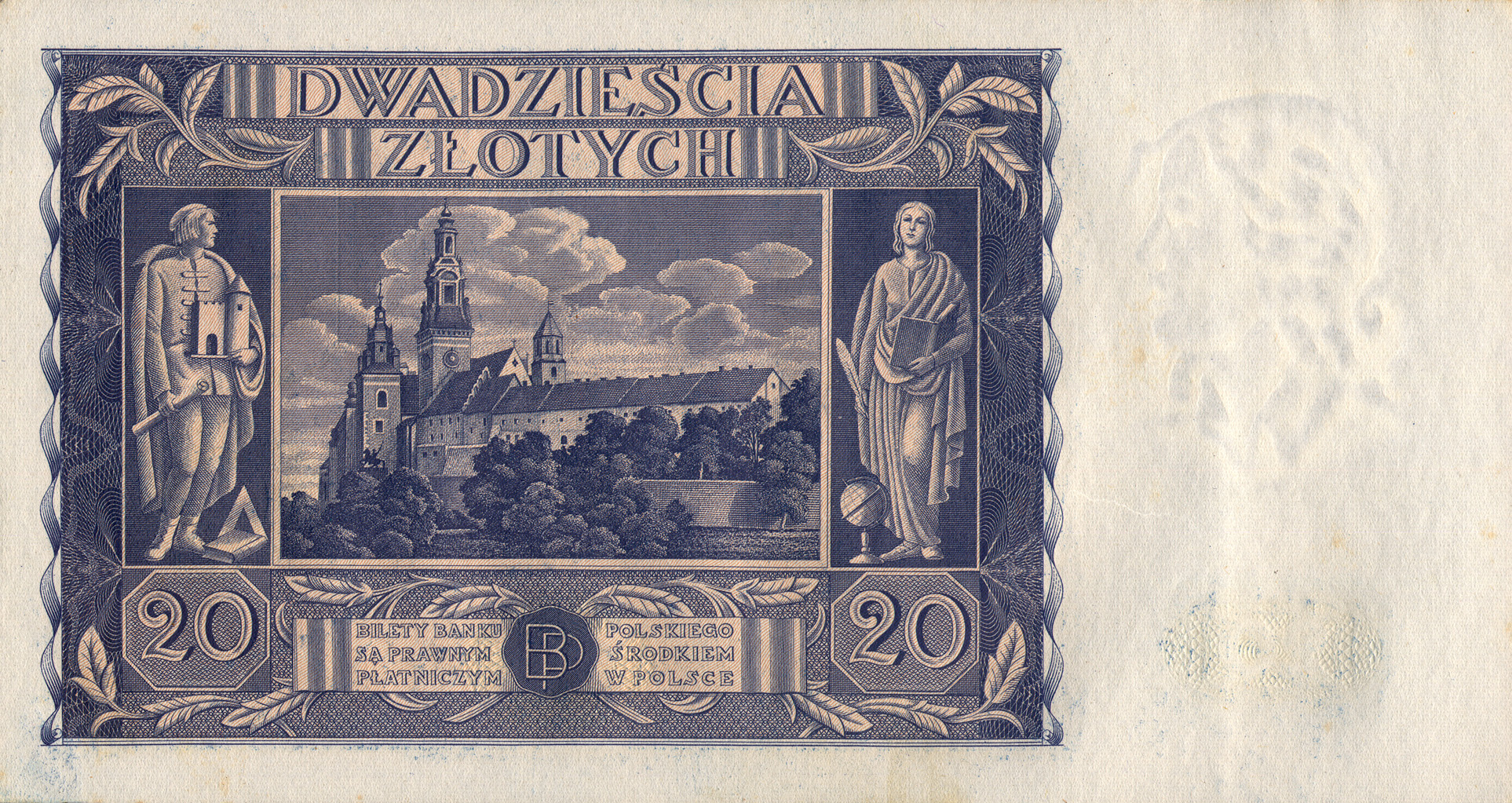
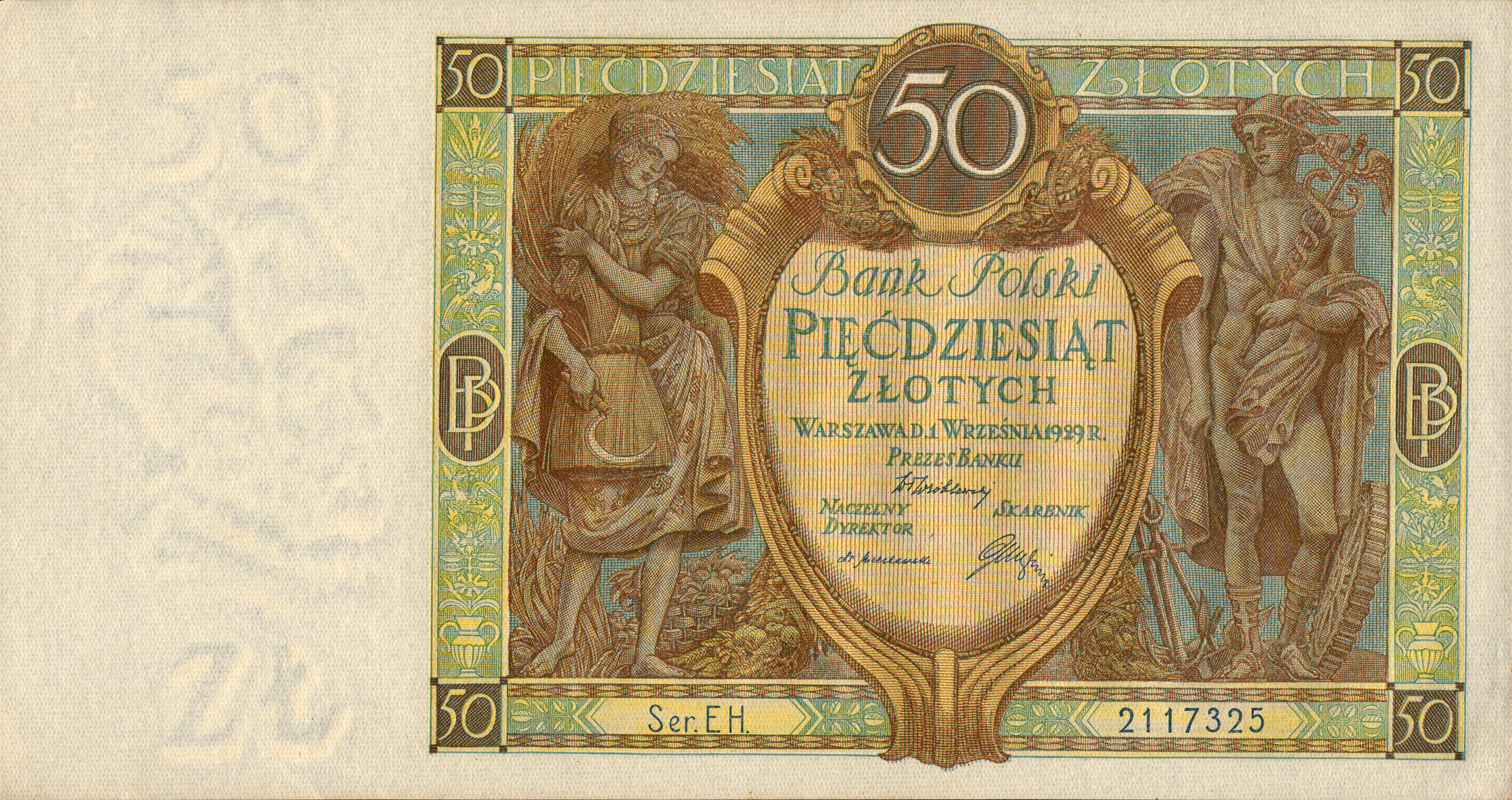
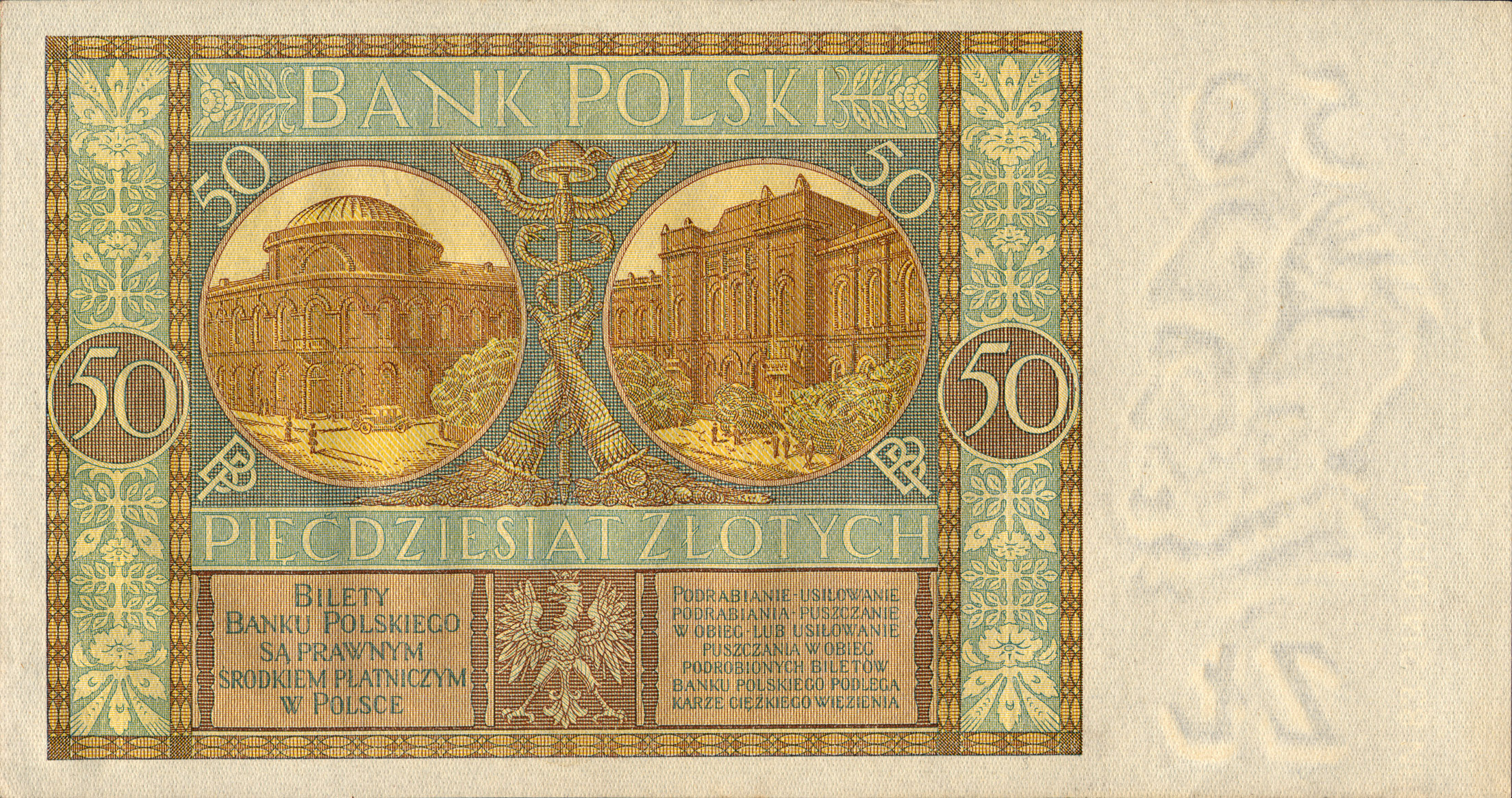
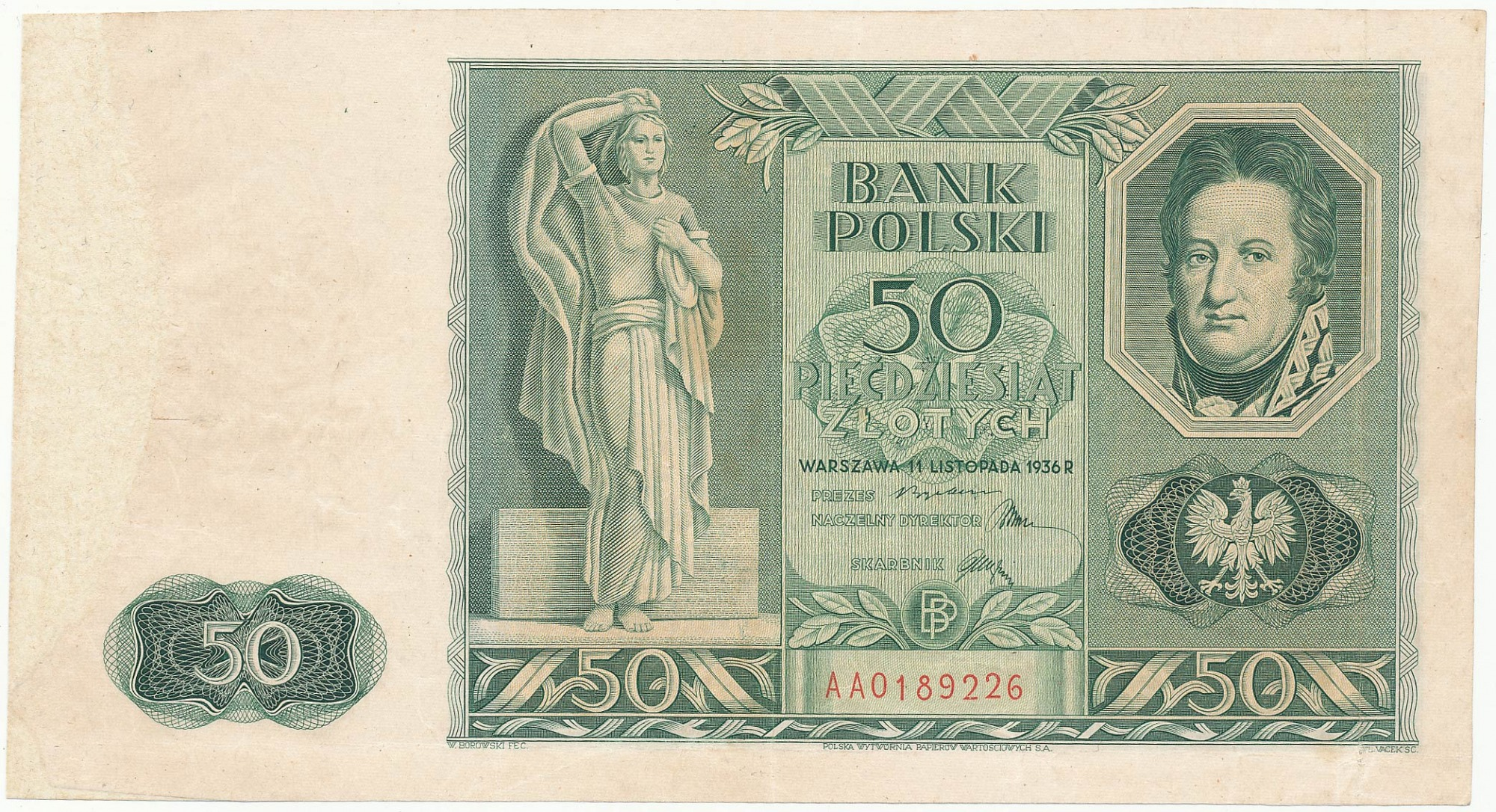
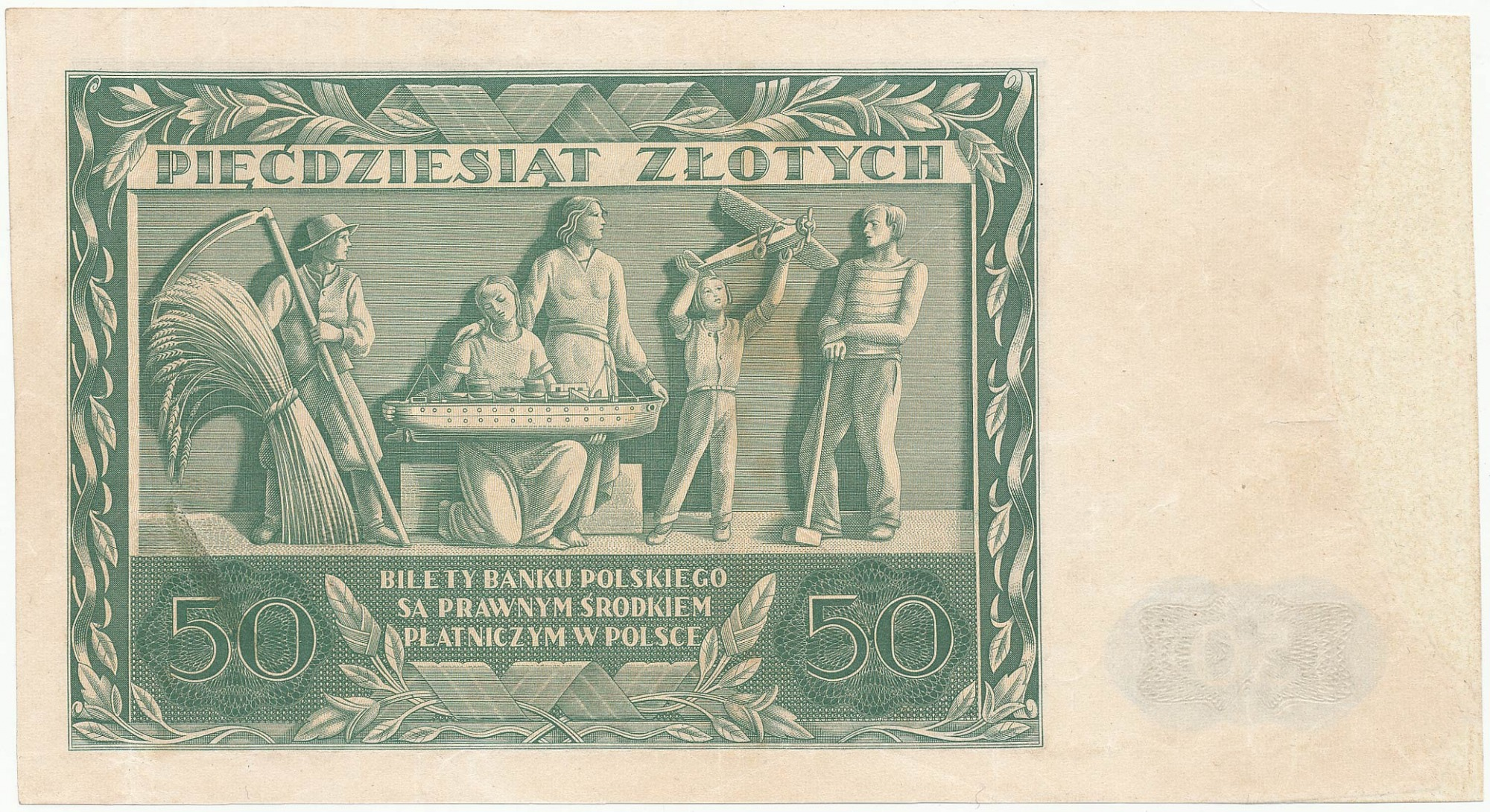
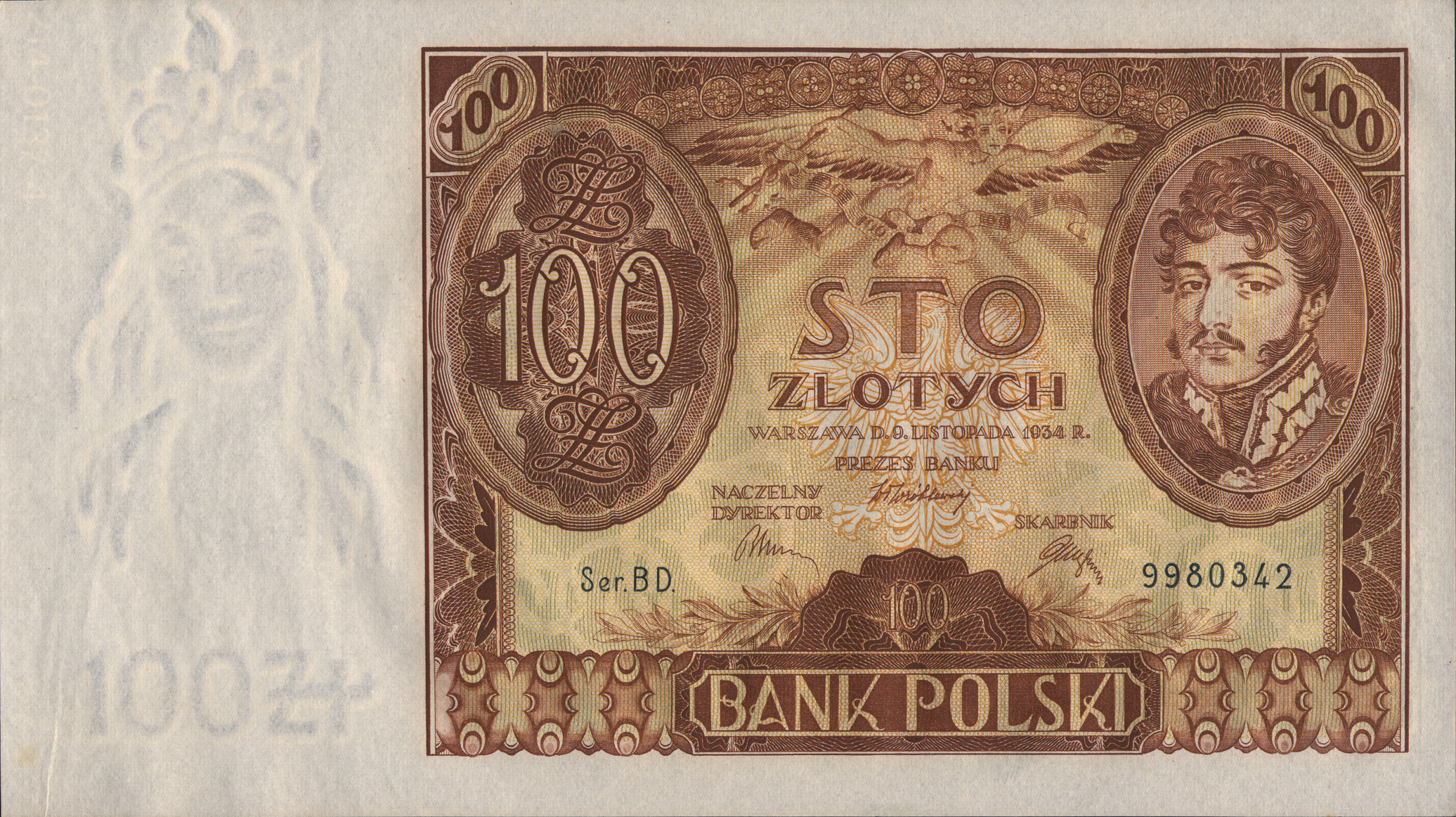
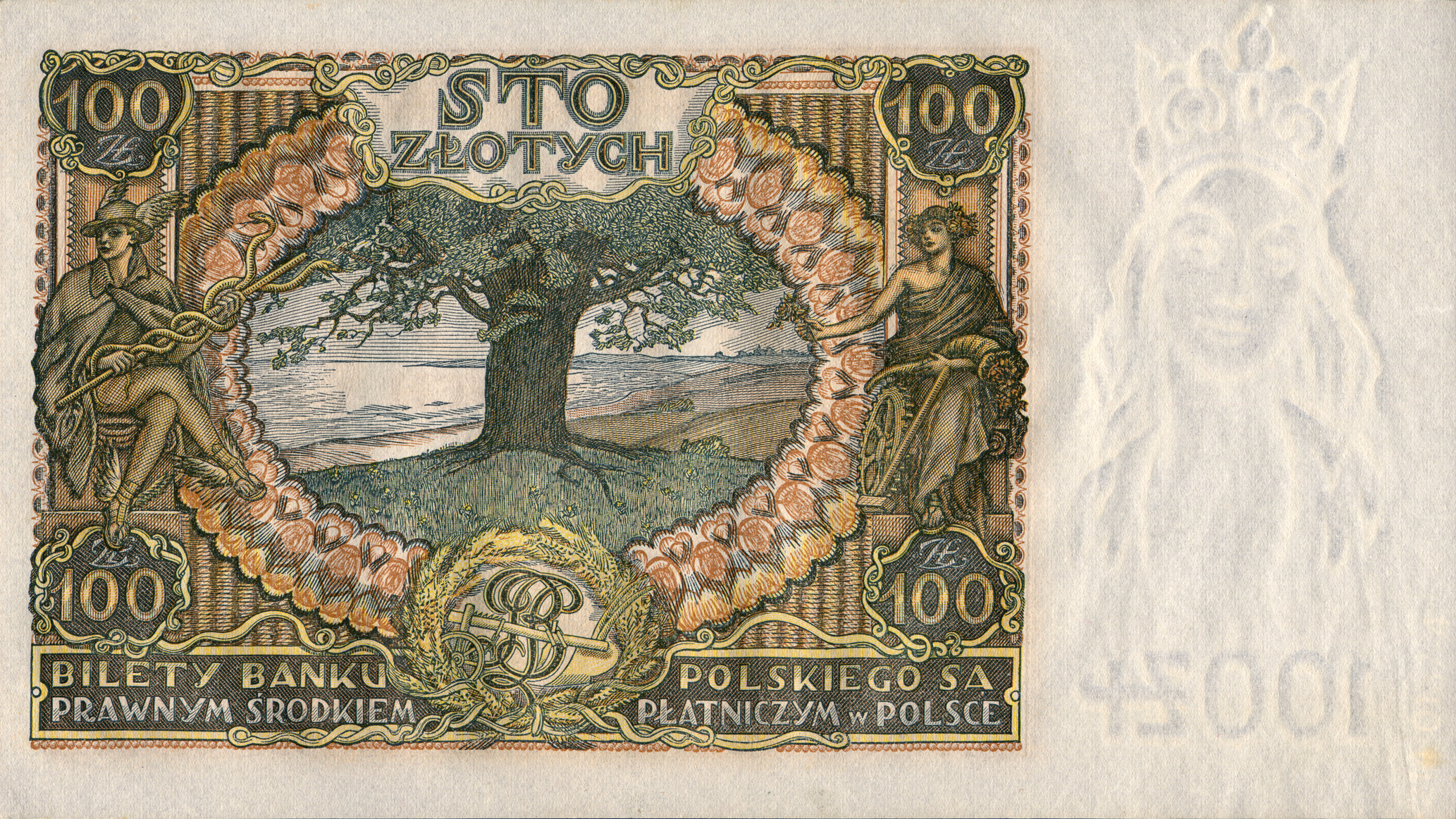
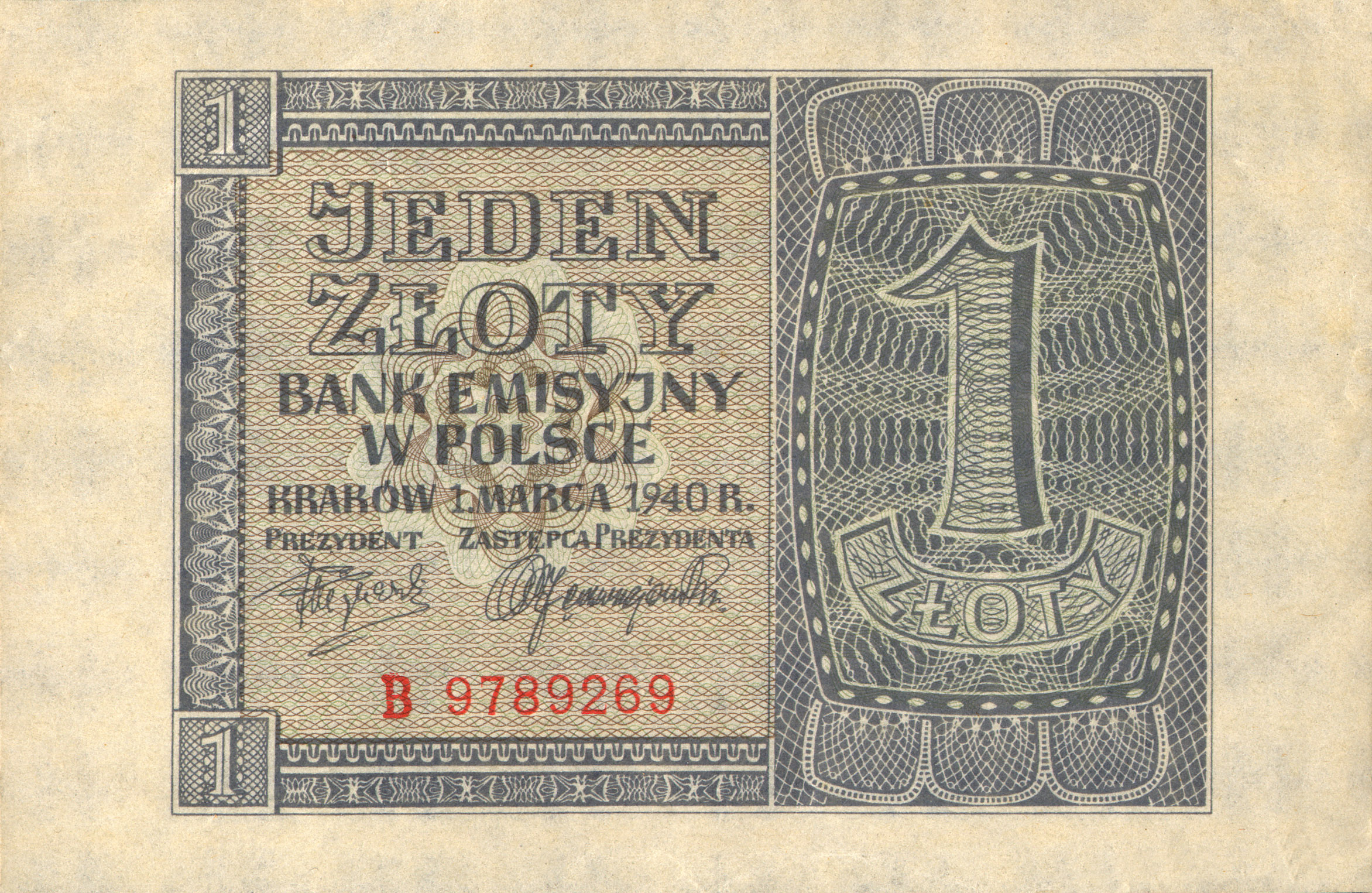
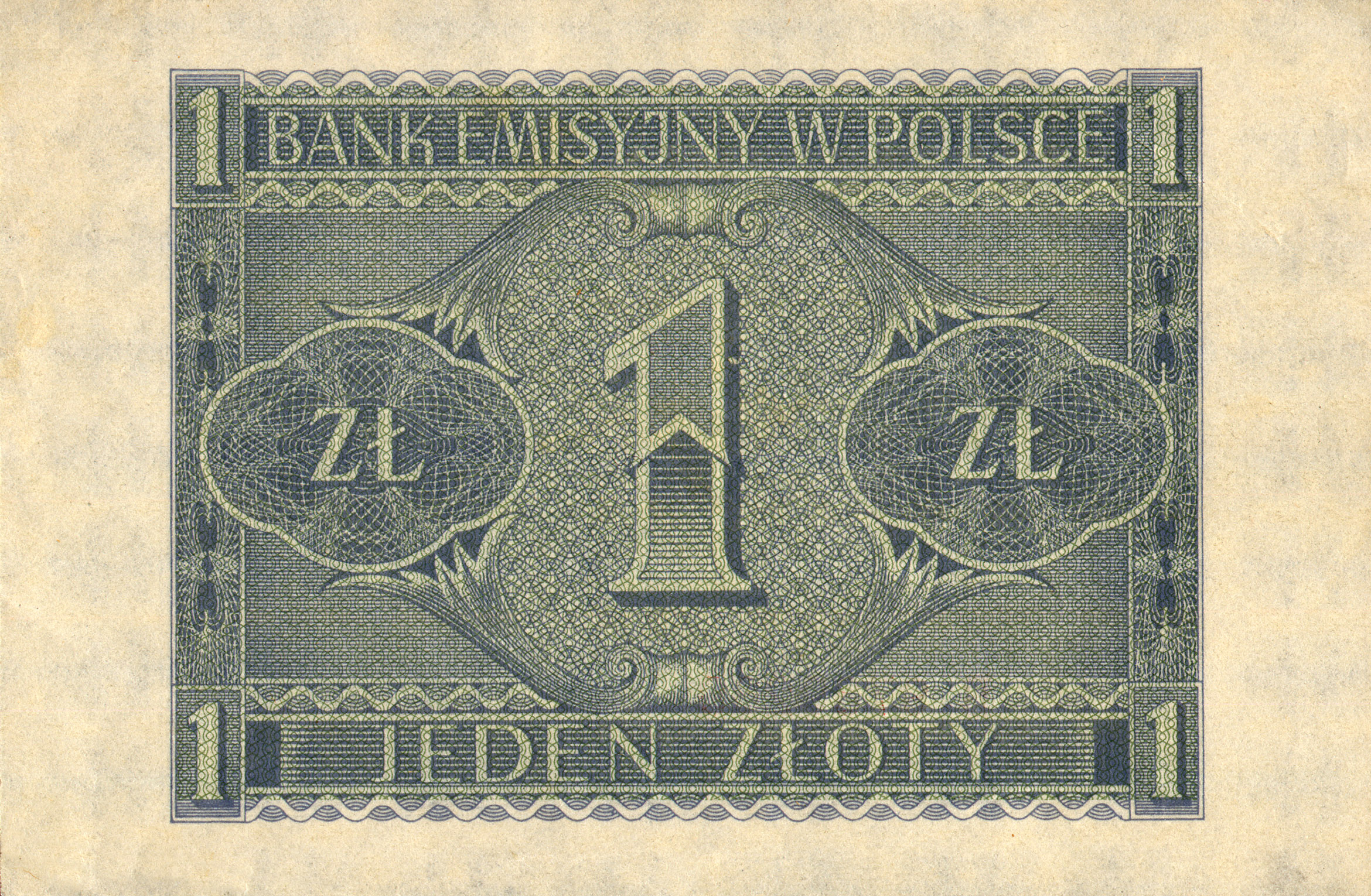
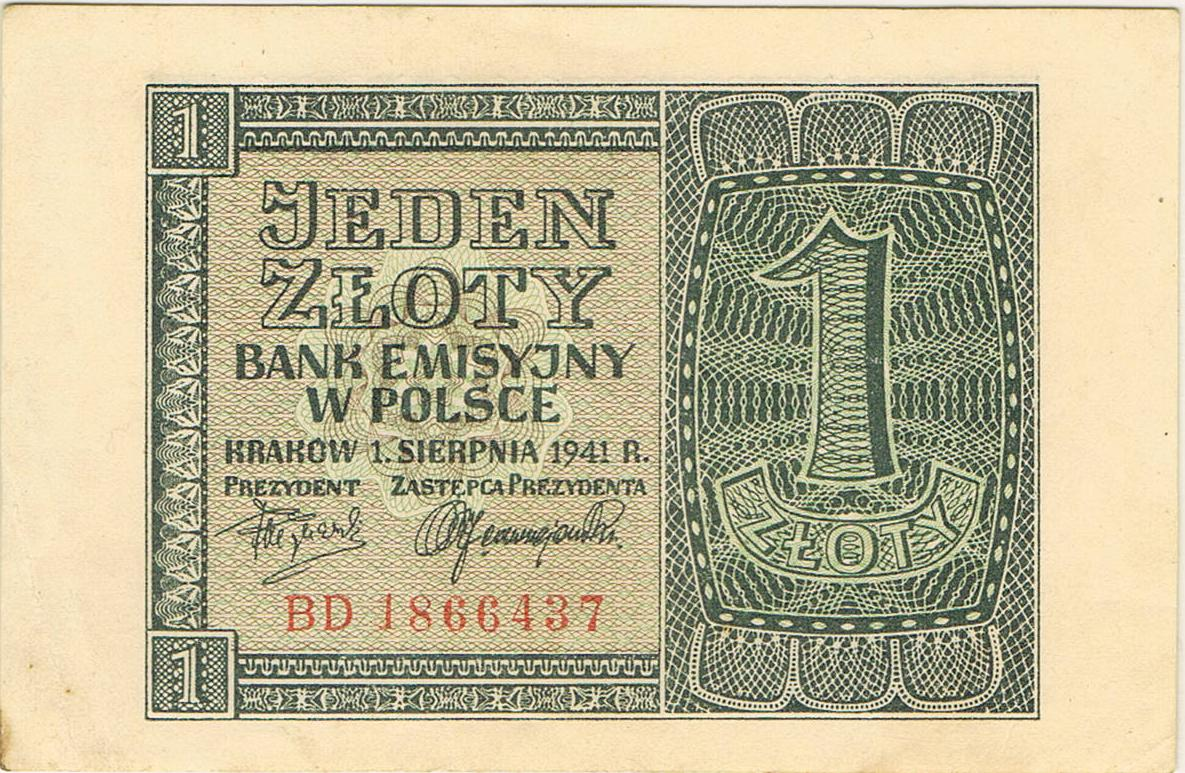
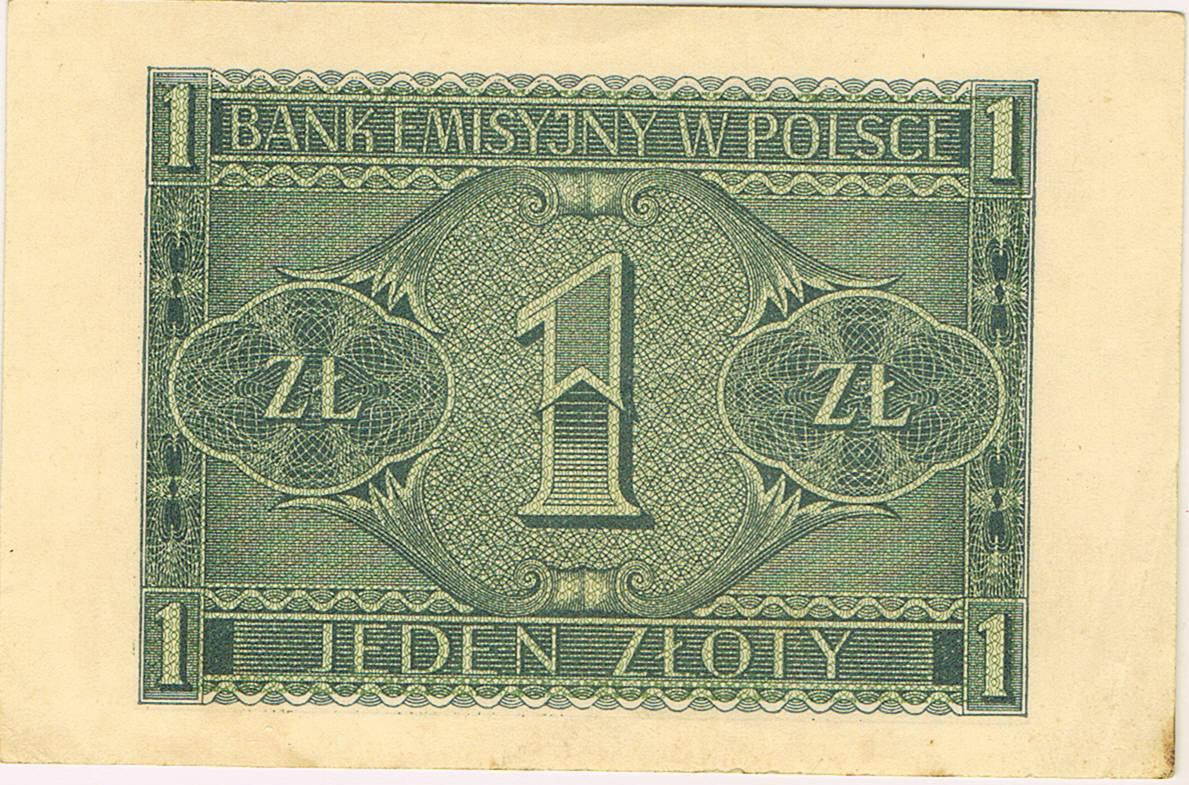
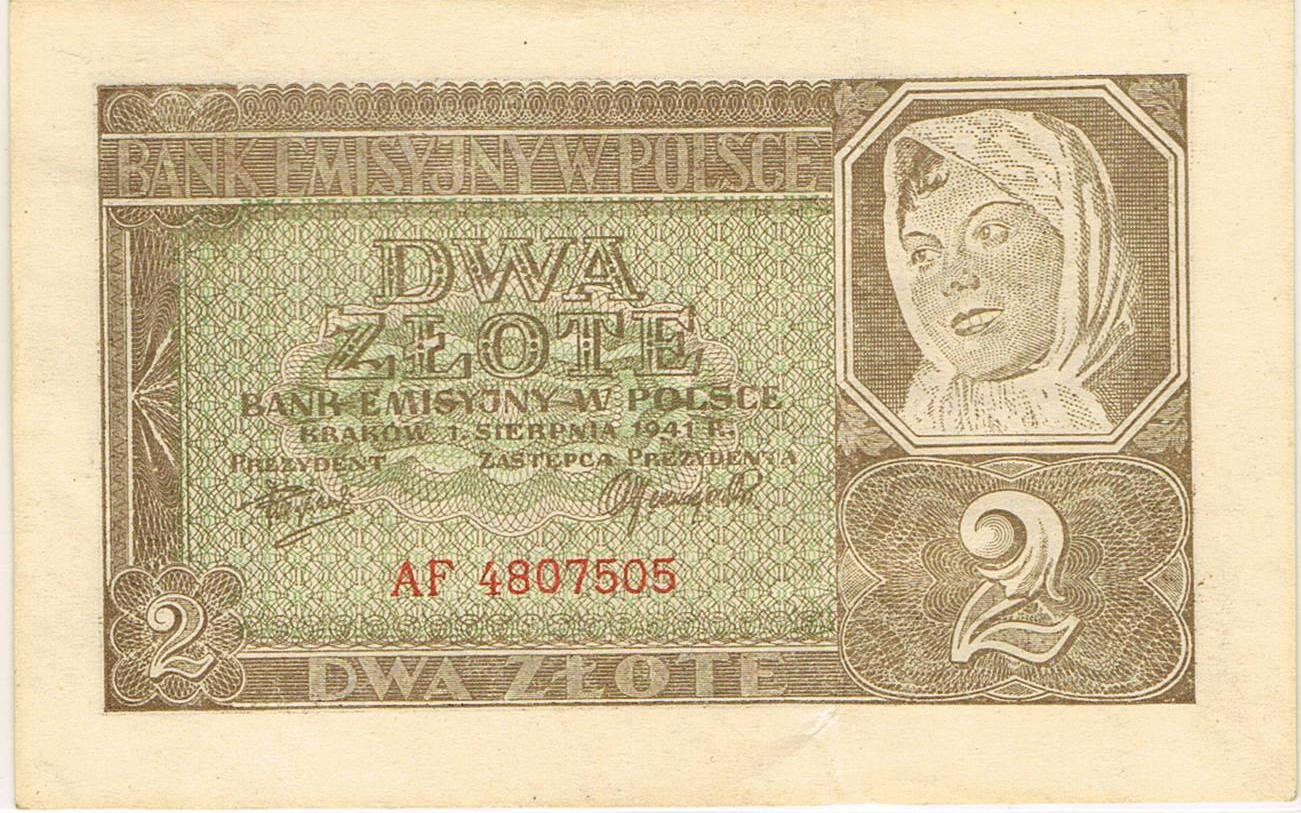
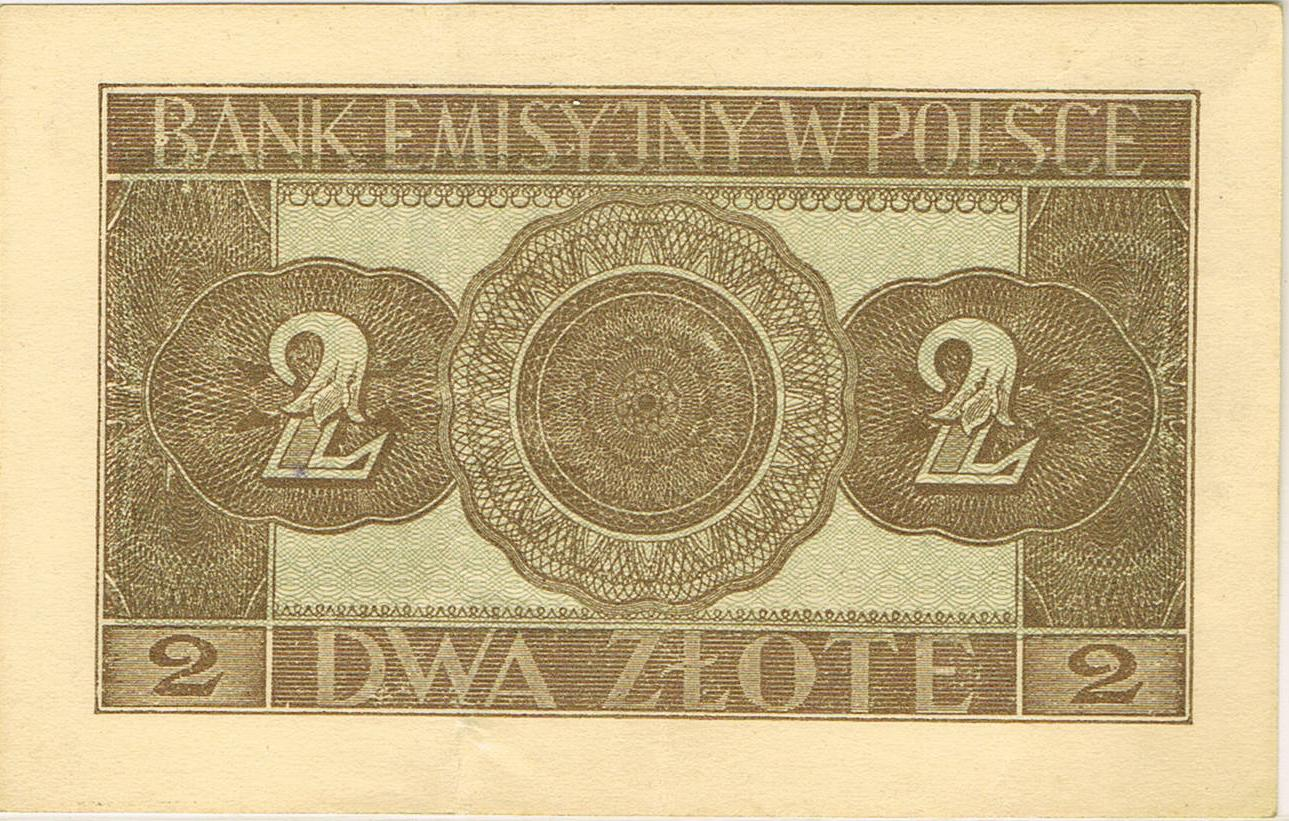
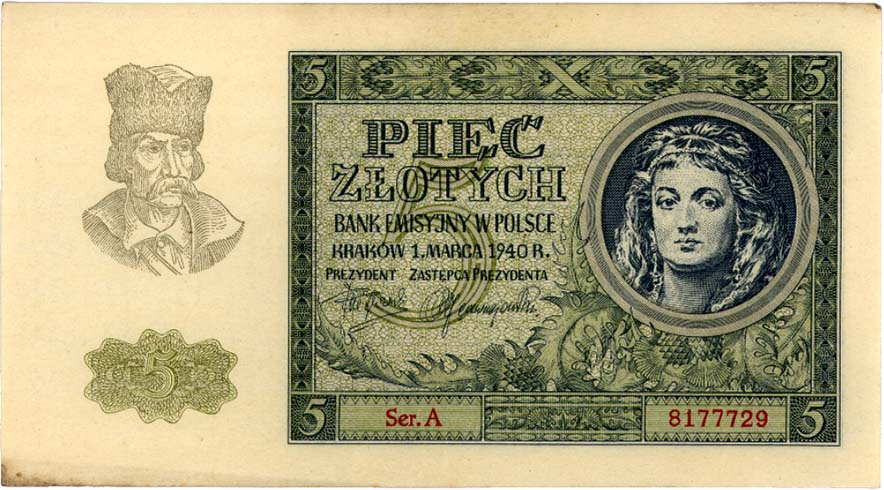
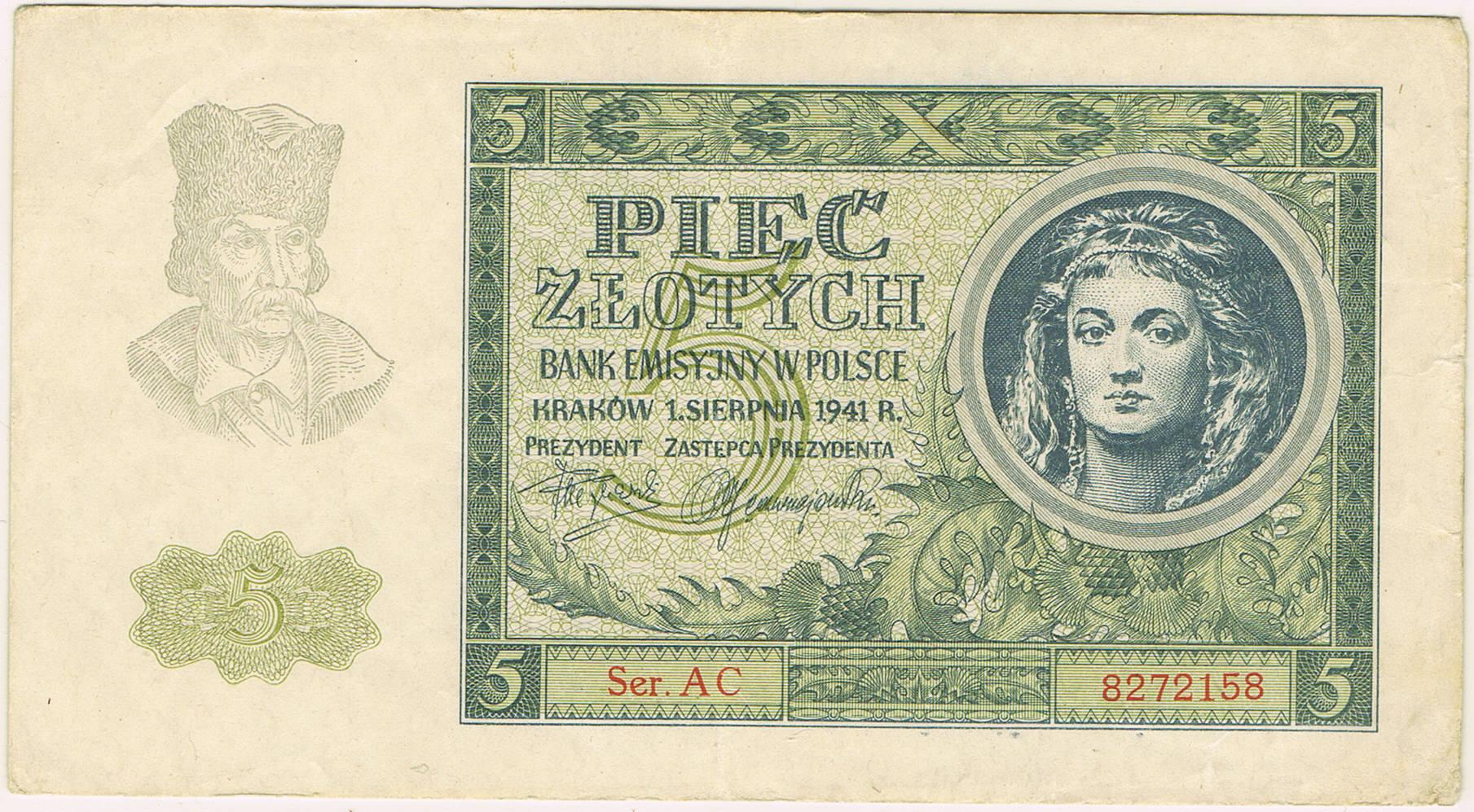
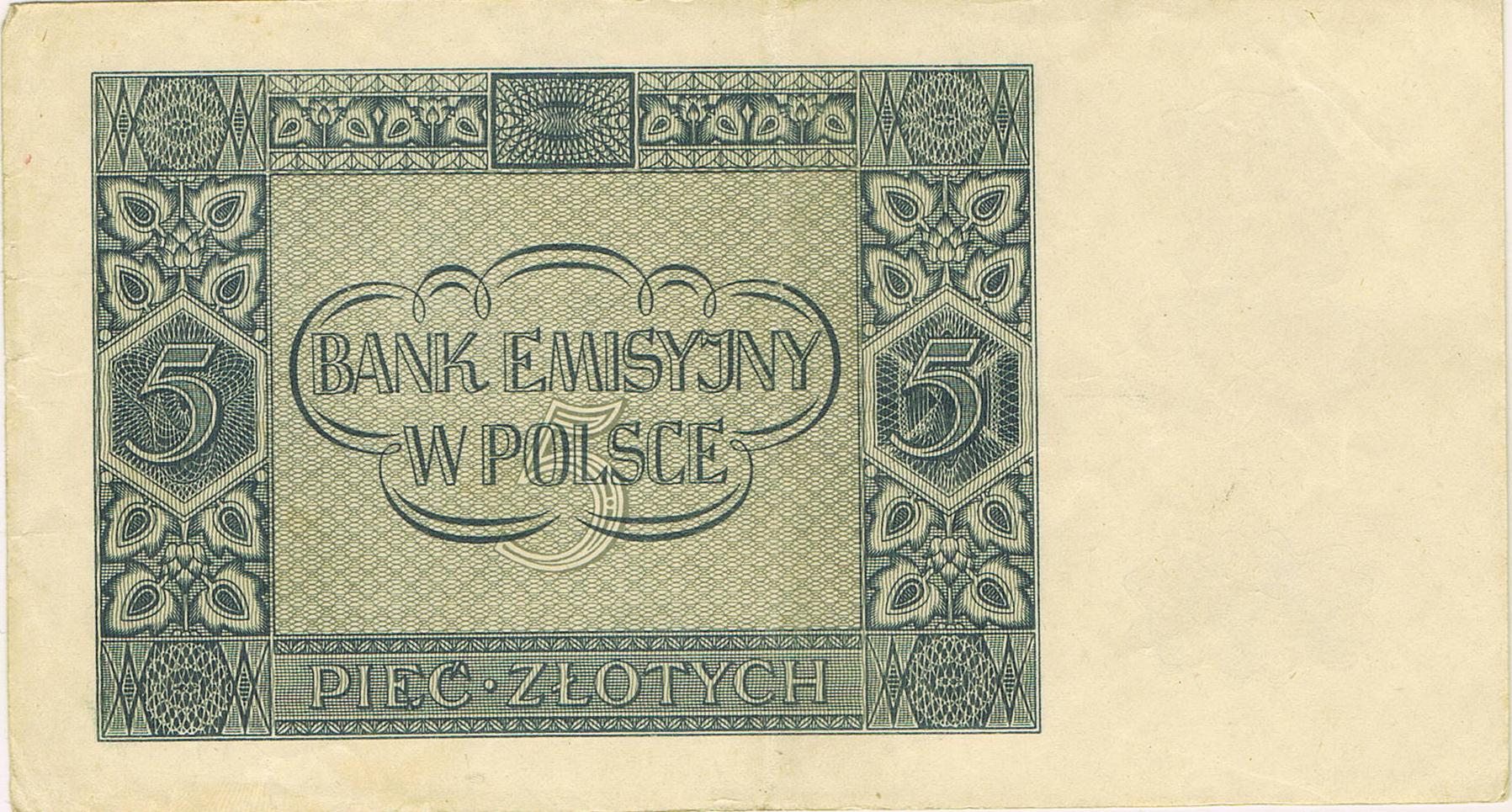
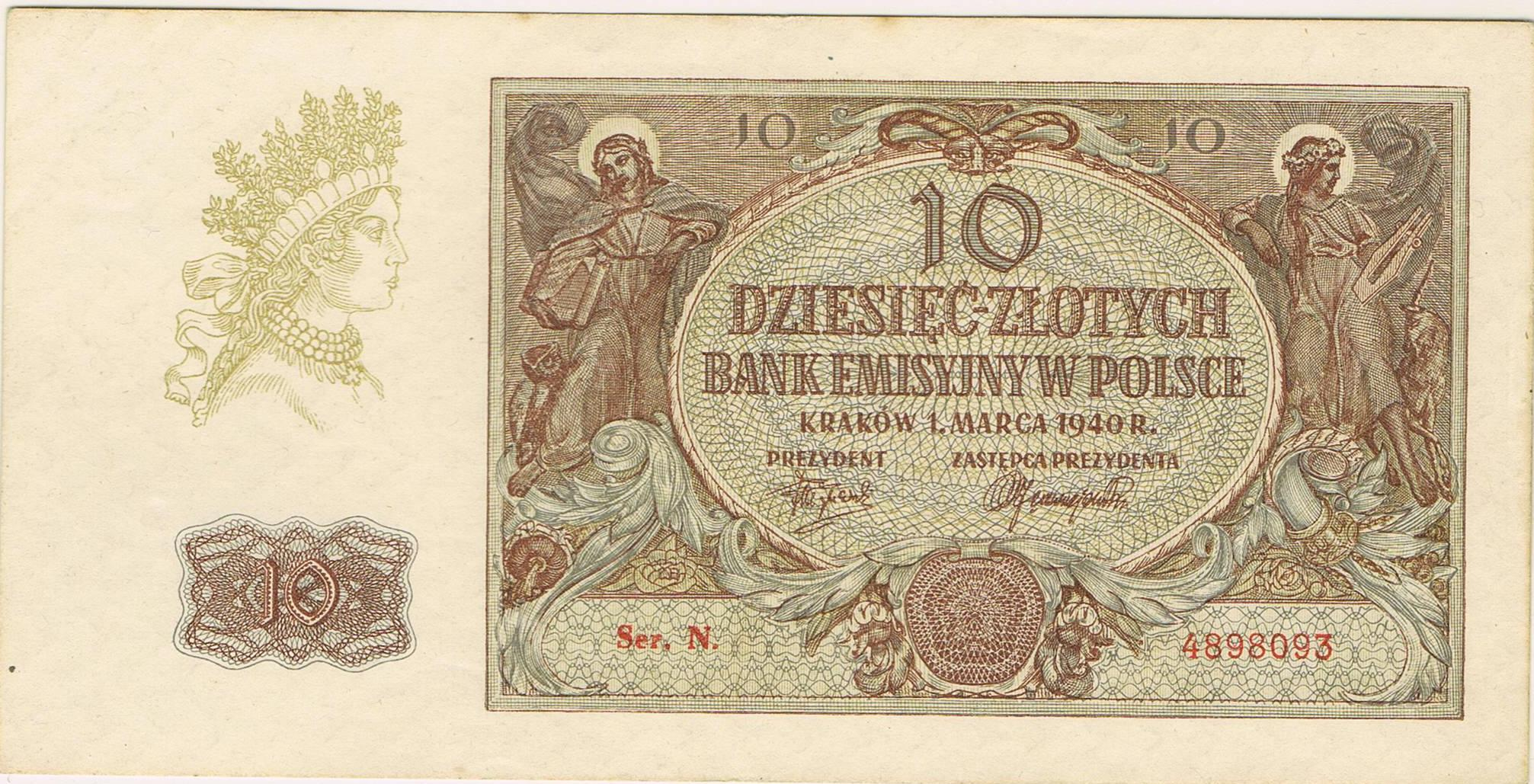
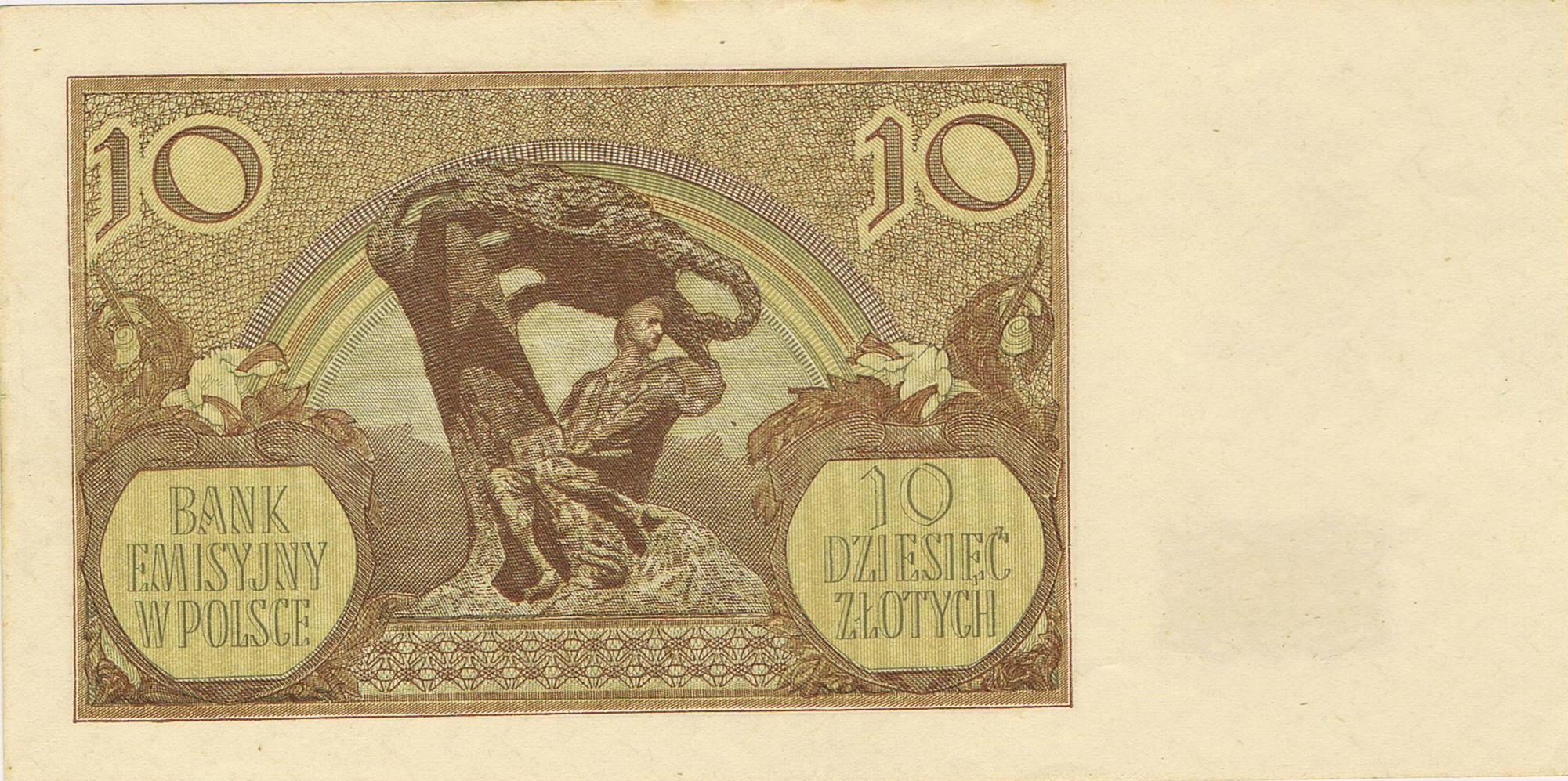
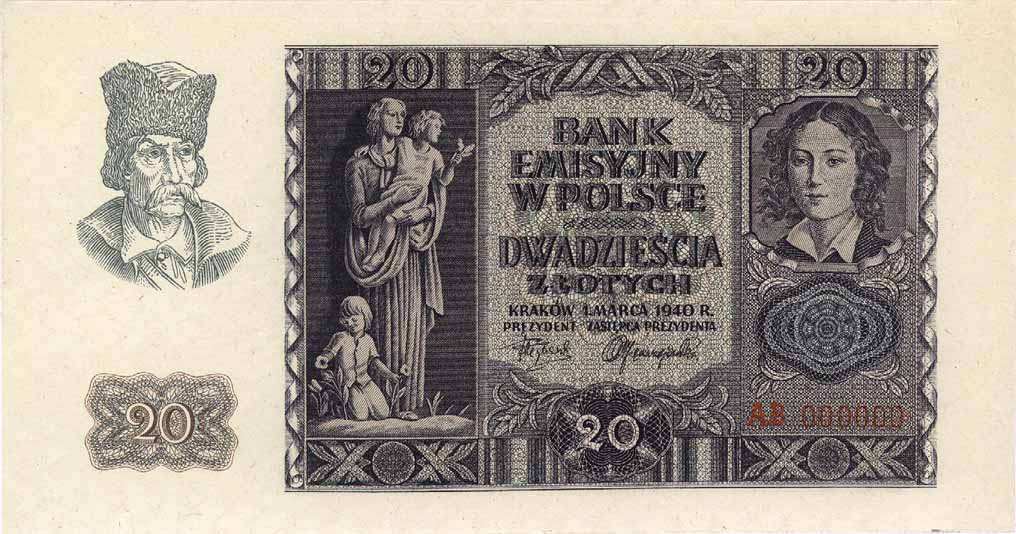
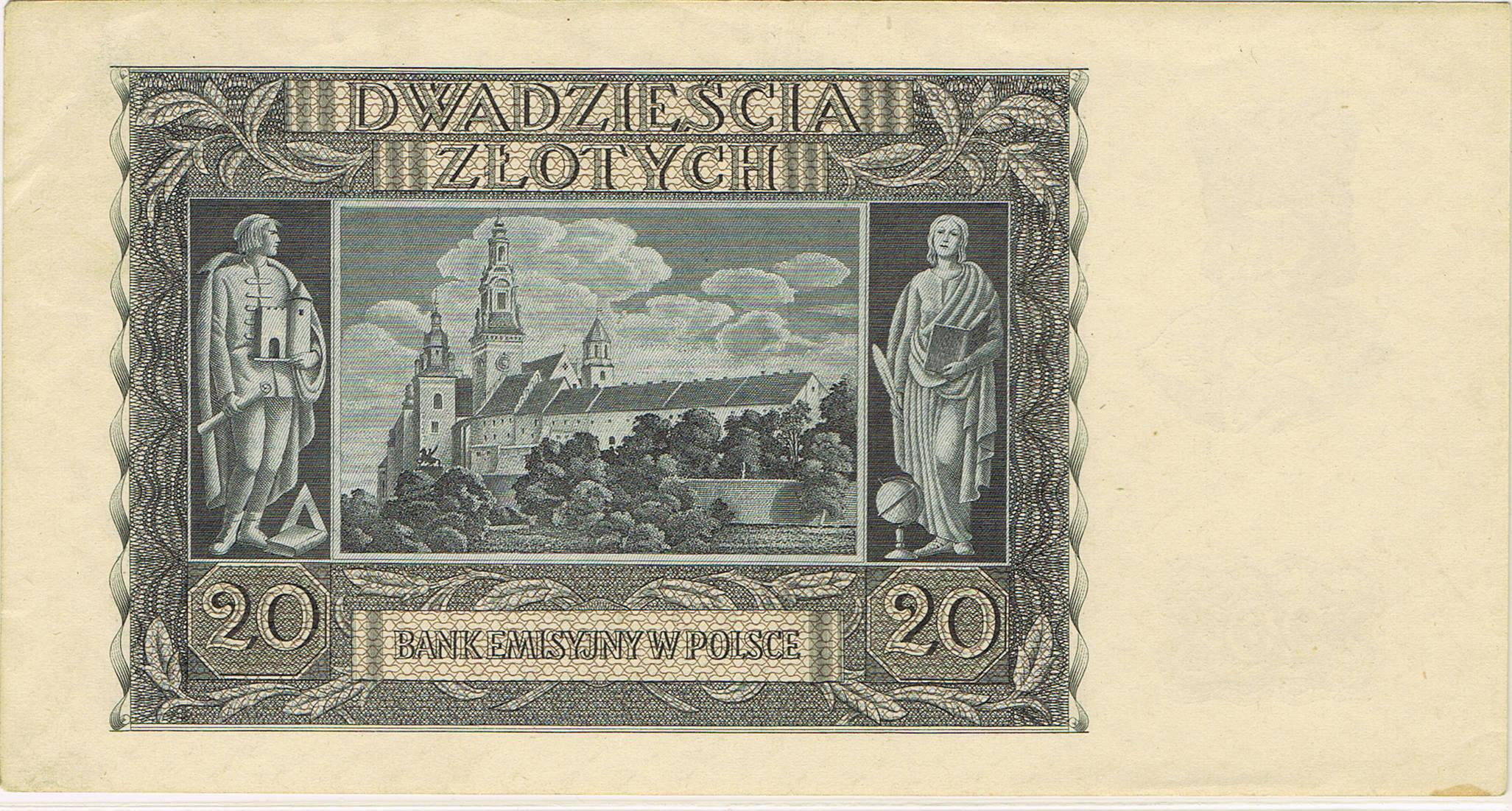
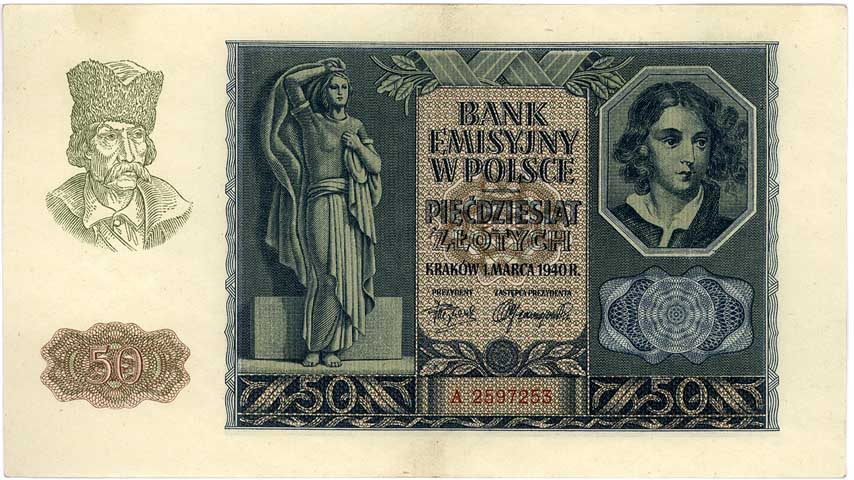
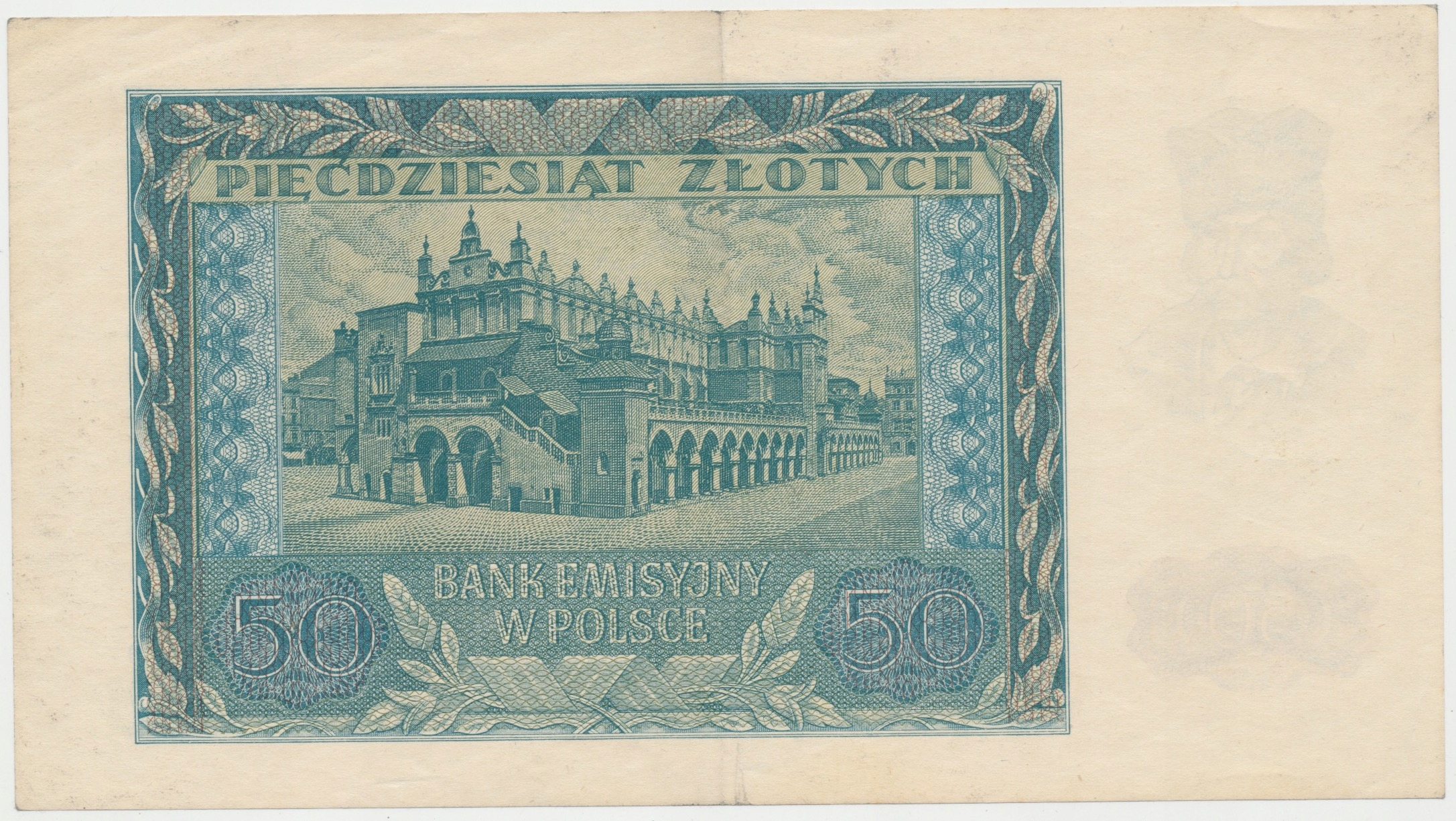
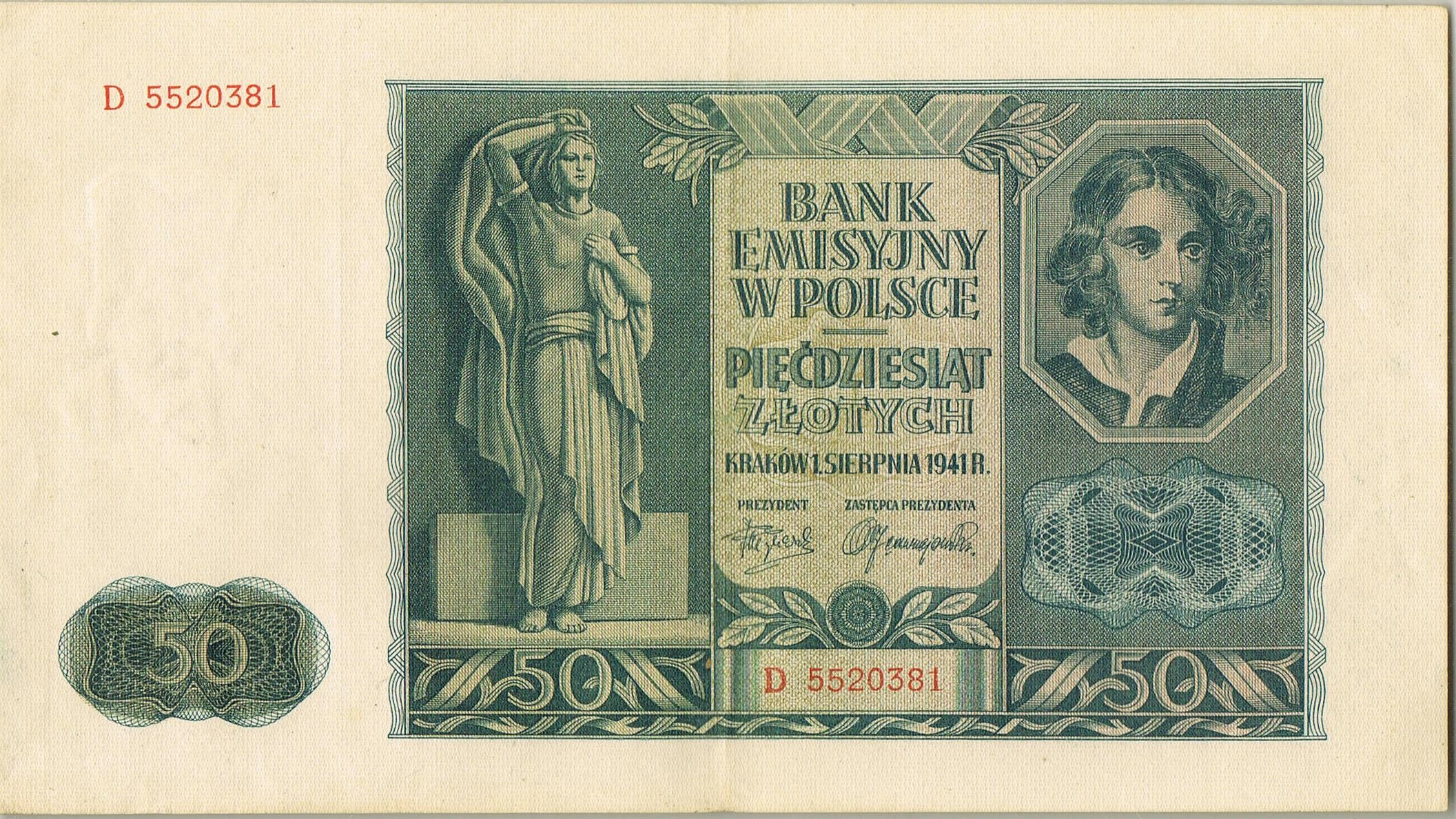
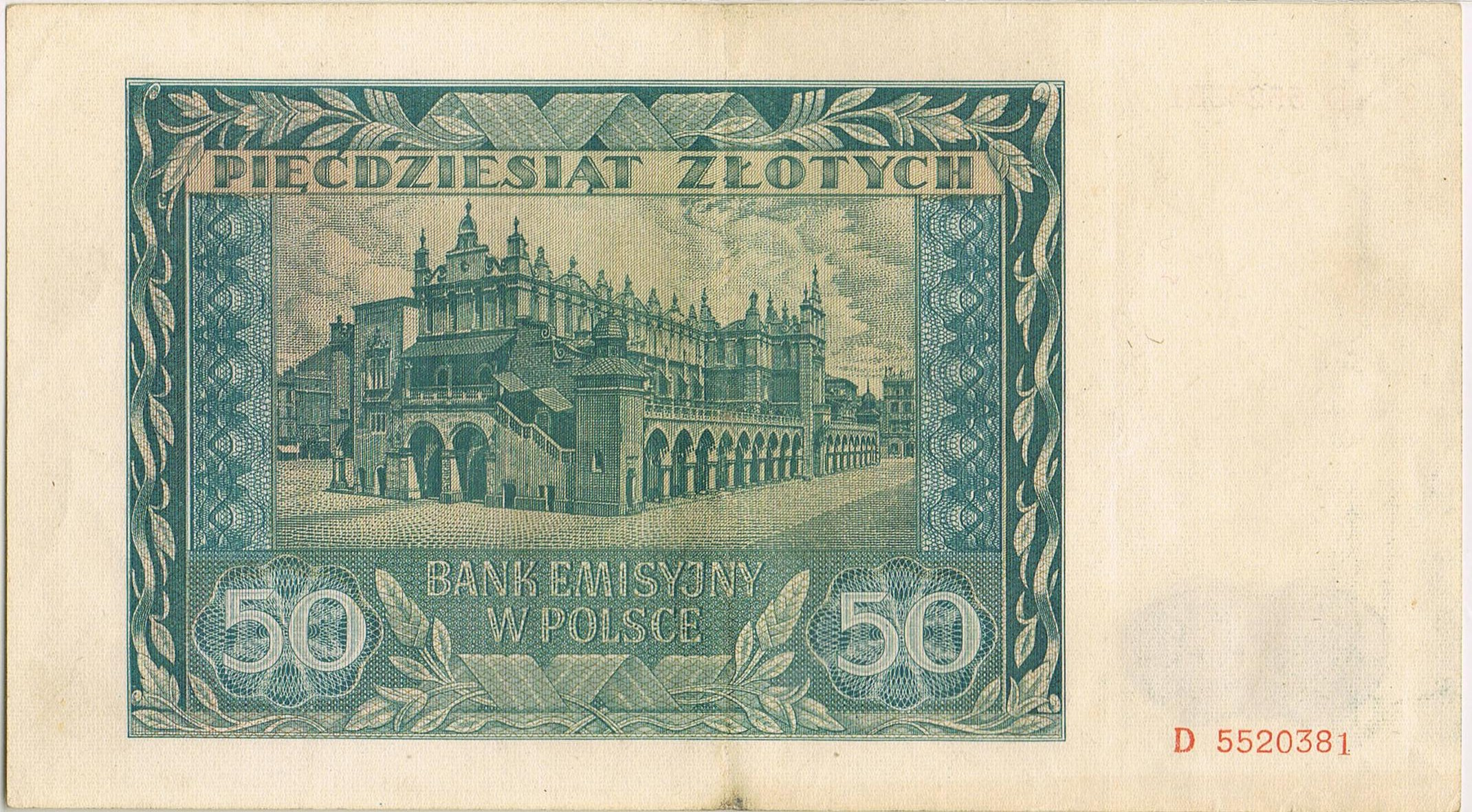
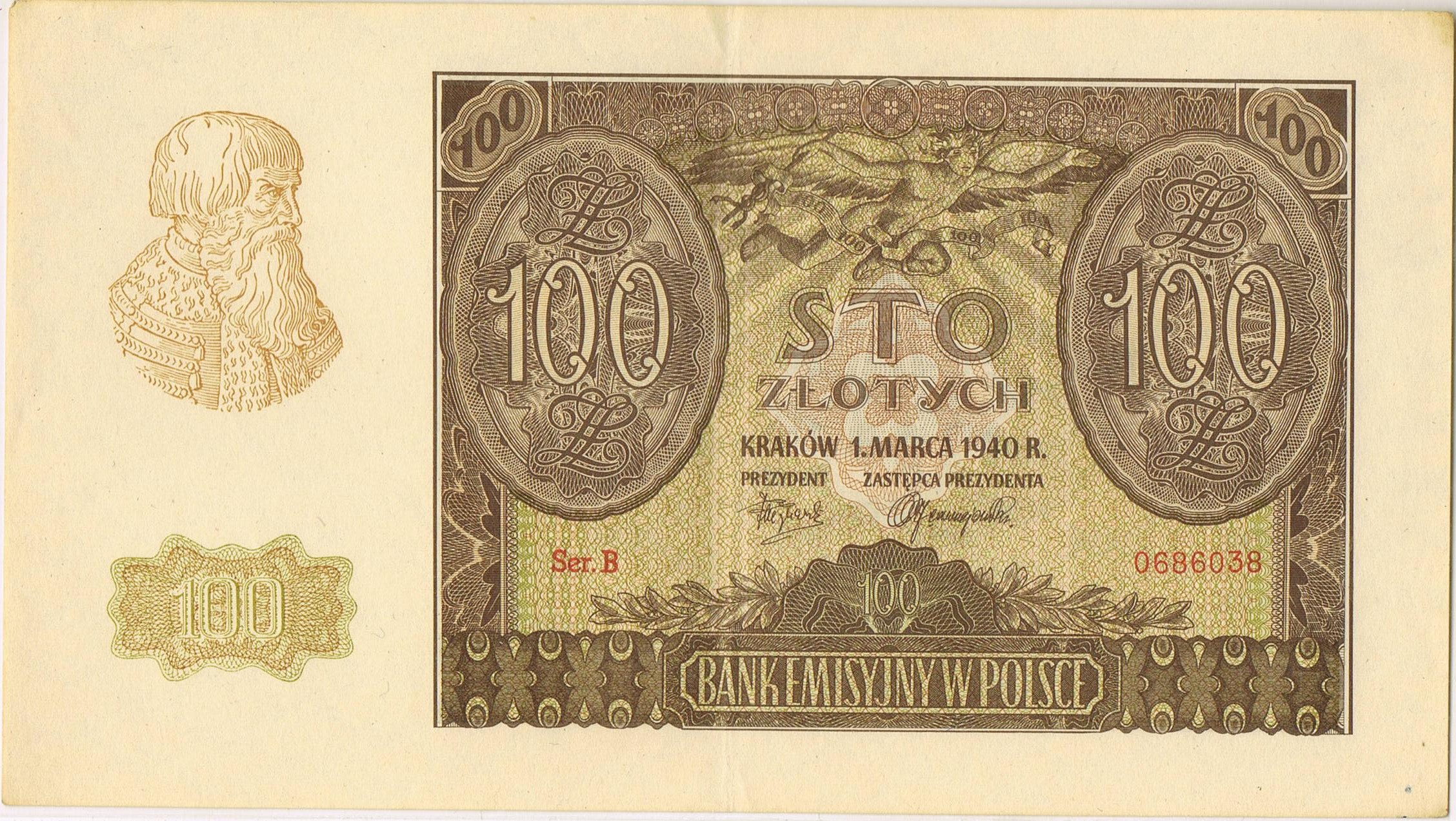
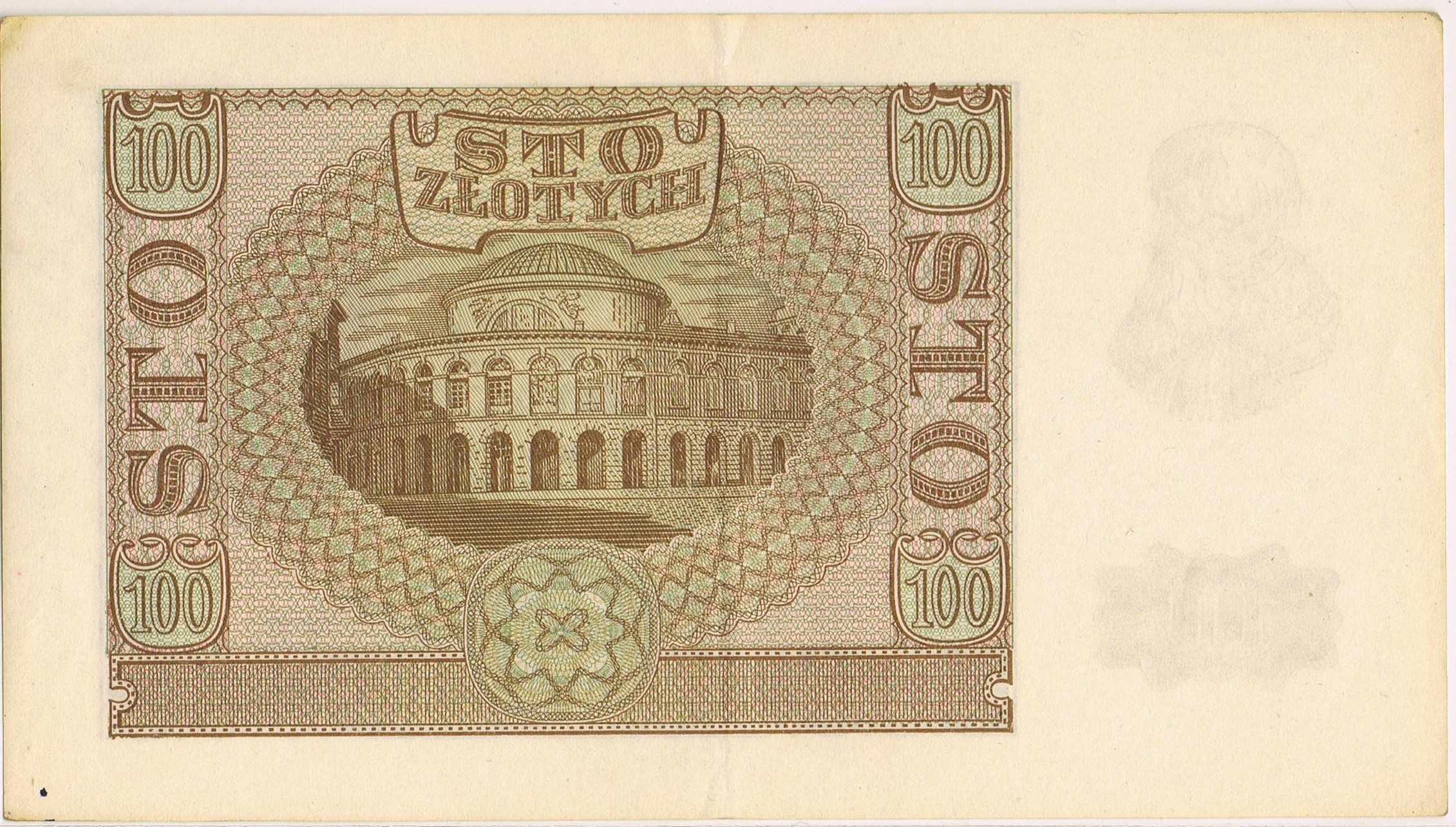
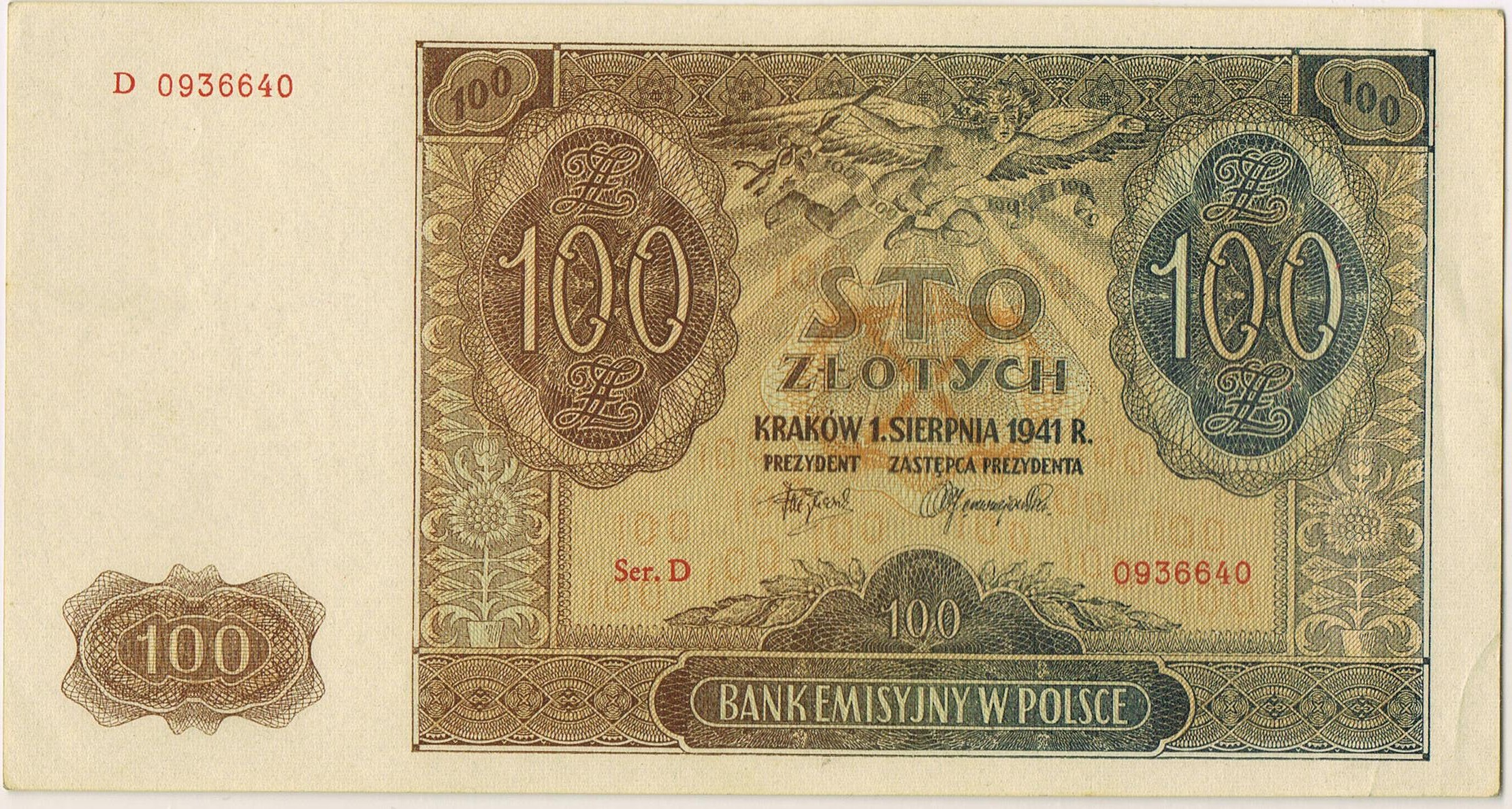
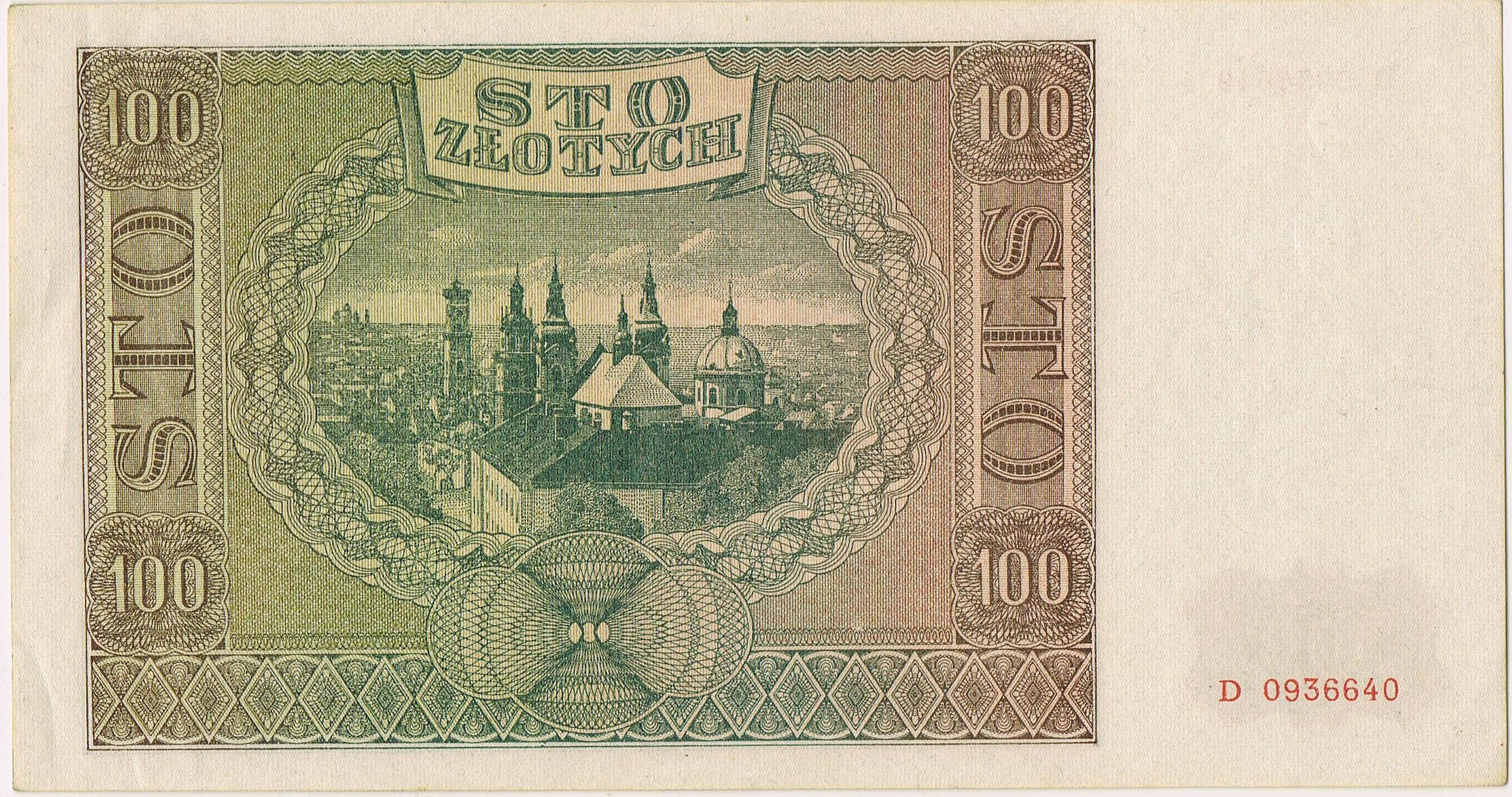
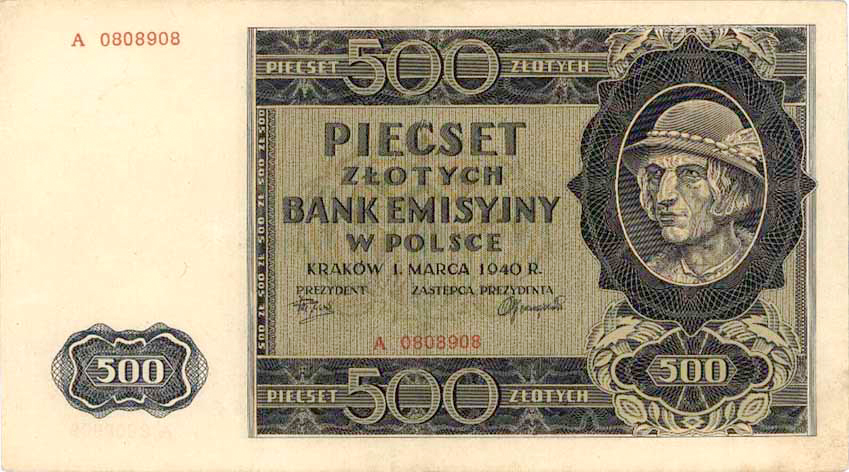
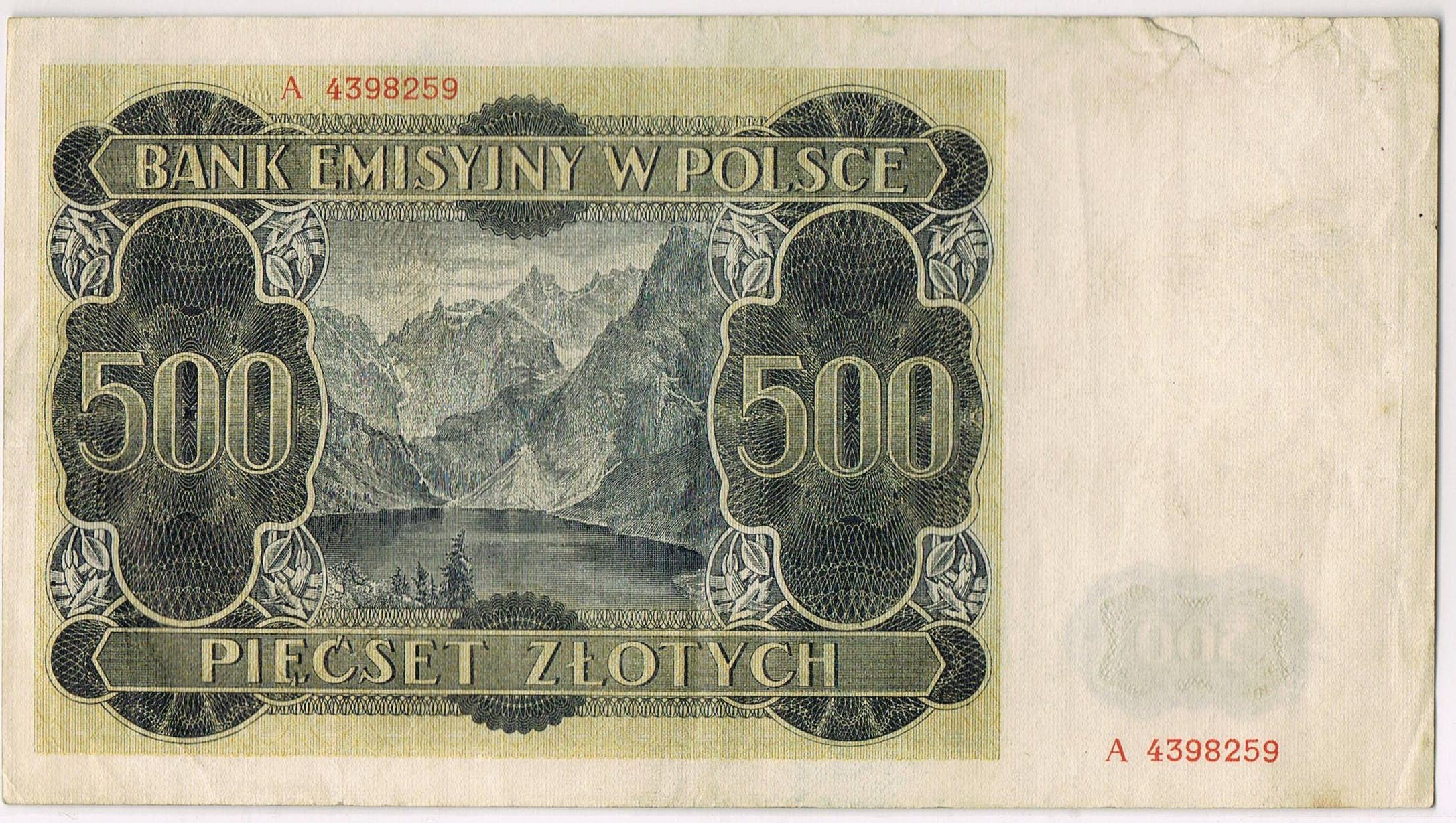
Unit (ZŁ)	Obverse	Reverse
Banknotes (1917-1924) Polish marka
1/2 mark
10 marks
50 marks
100 marks
Banknotes (1924-1939)
10 gr
2 zł (1936)
5 zł (1930)
10 zł (1929)
20 zł (1929)
20 zł (1931)
20 zł (1936)
50 zł (1929)
50 zł (1936)
100 zł (1934)
Banknotes (1939-1944)
1 zł (1940)
1 zł (1941)
2 zł (1941)
5 zł (1940)
5 zł (1941)
10 zł (1940)
20 zł (1940)
50 zł (1940)
50 zł (1941)
100 zł (1940)
100 zł (1941)
500 zł (1940)

=== Post-WWII ===
Polish coins and banknotes
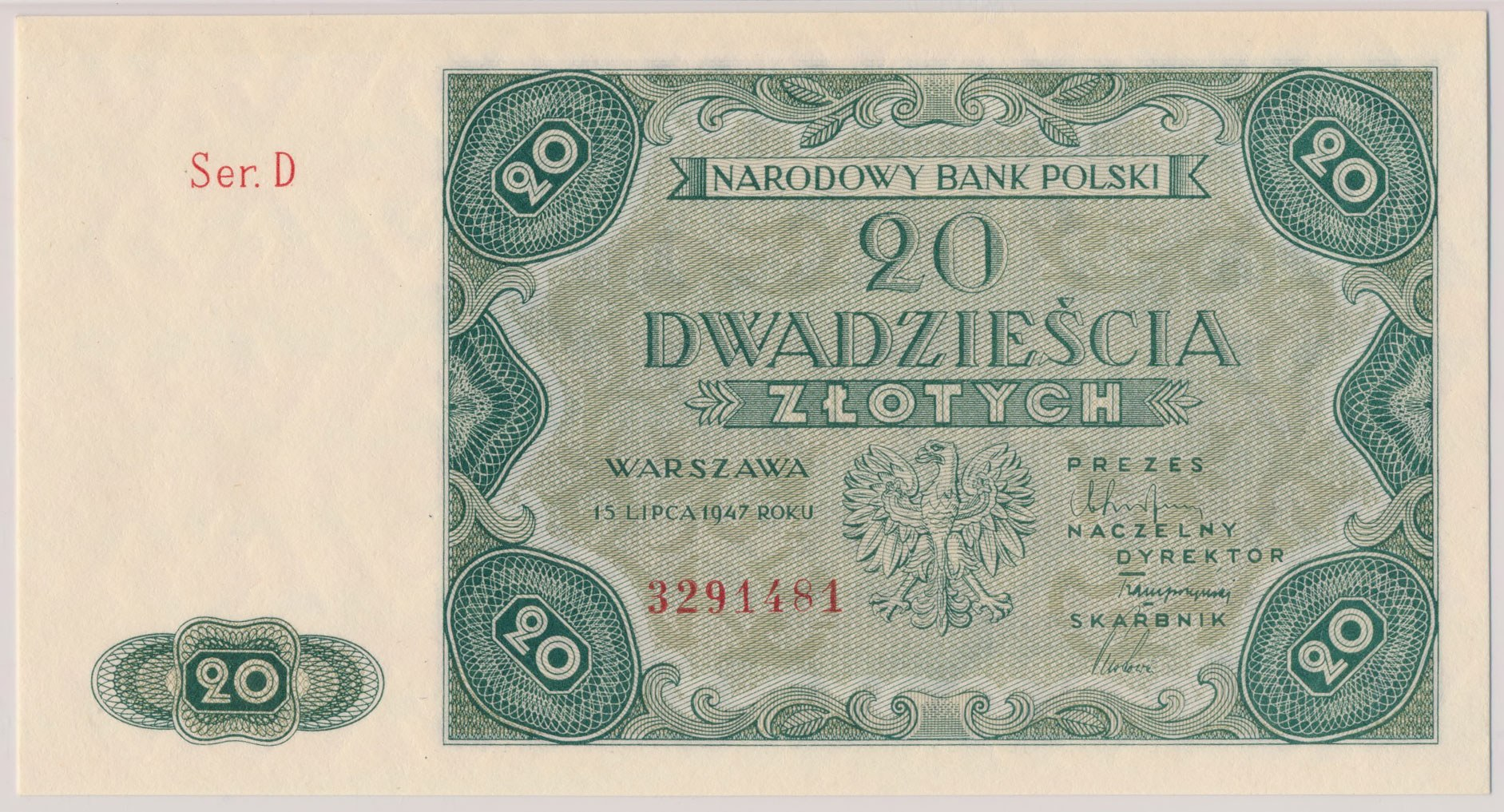
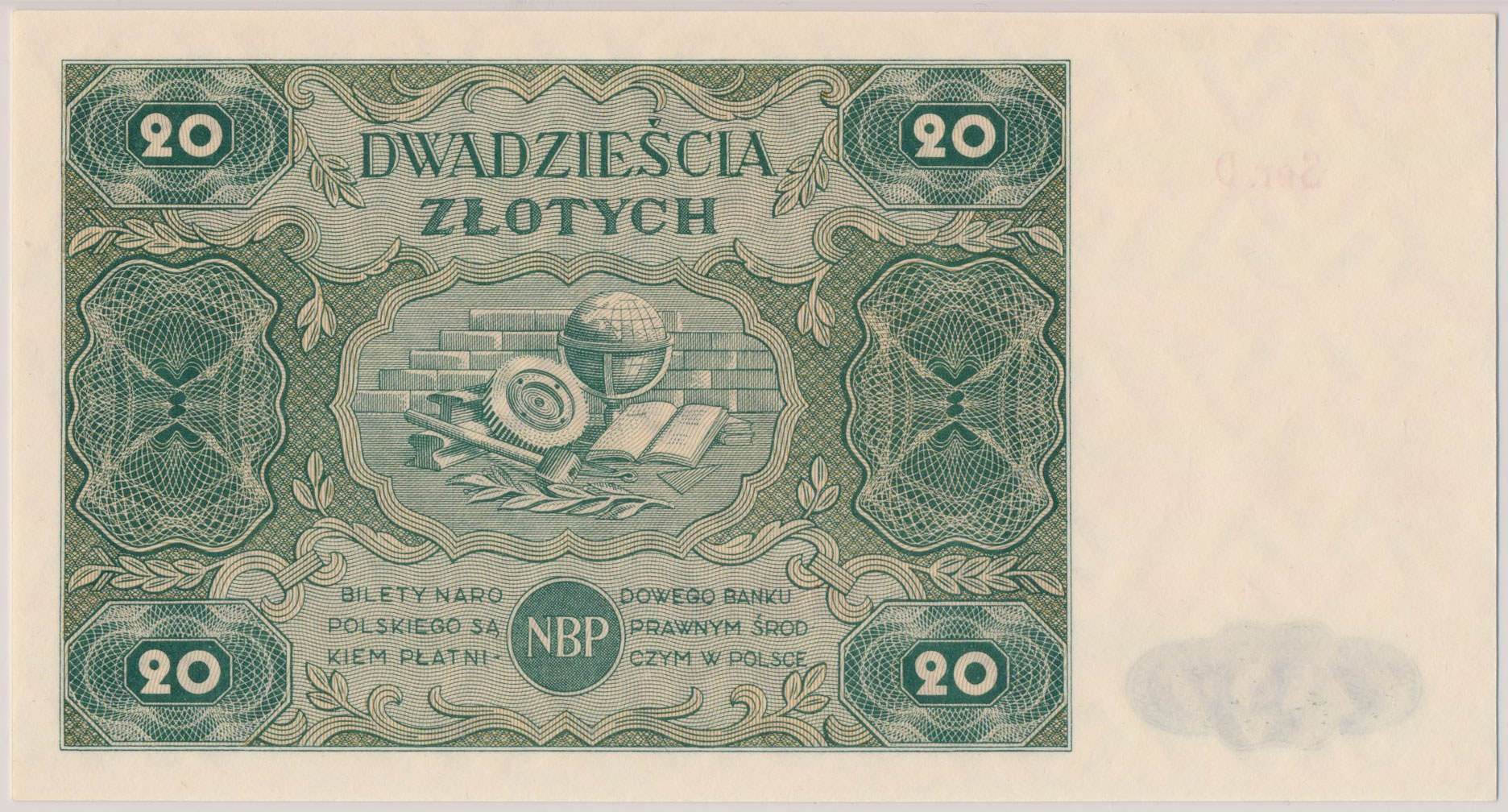
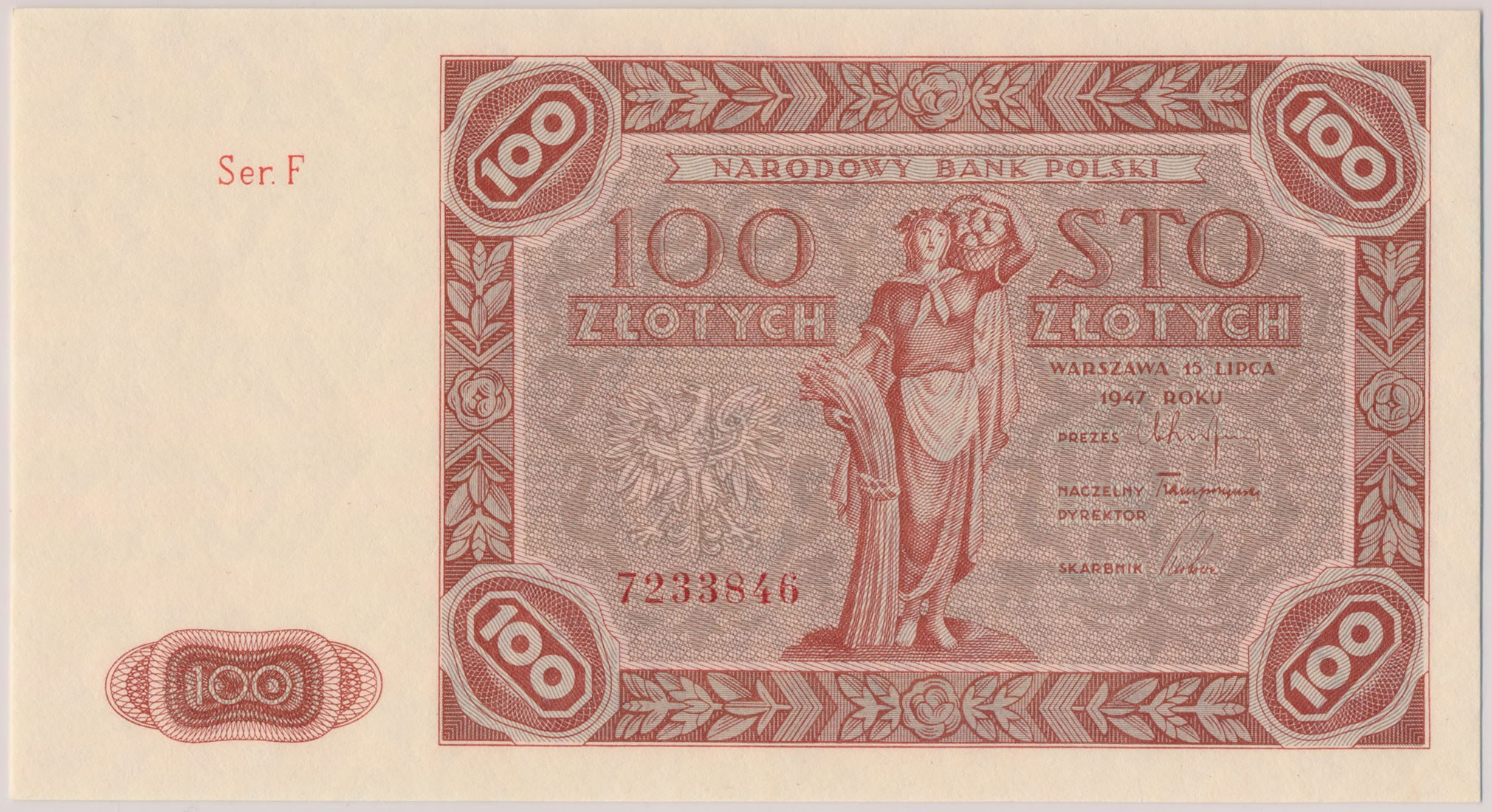
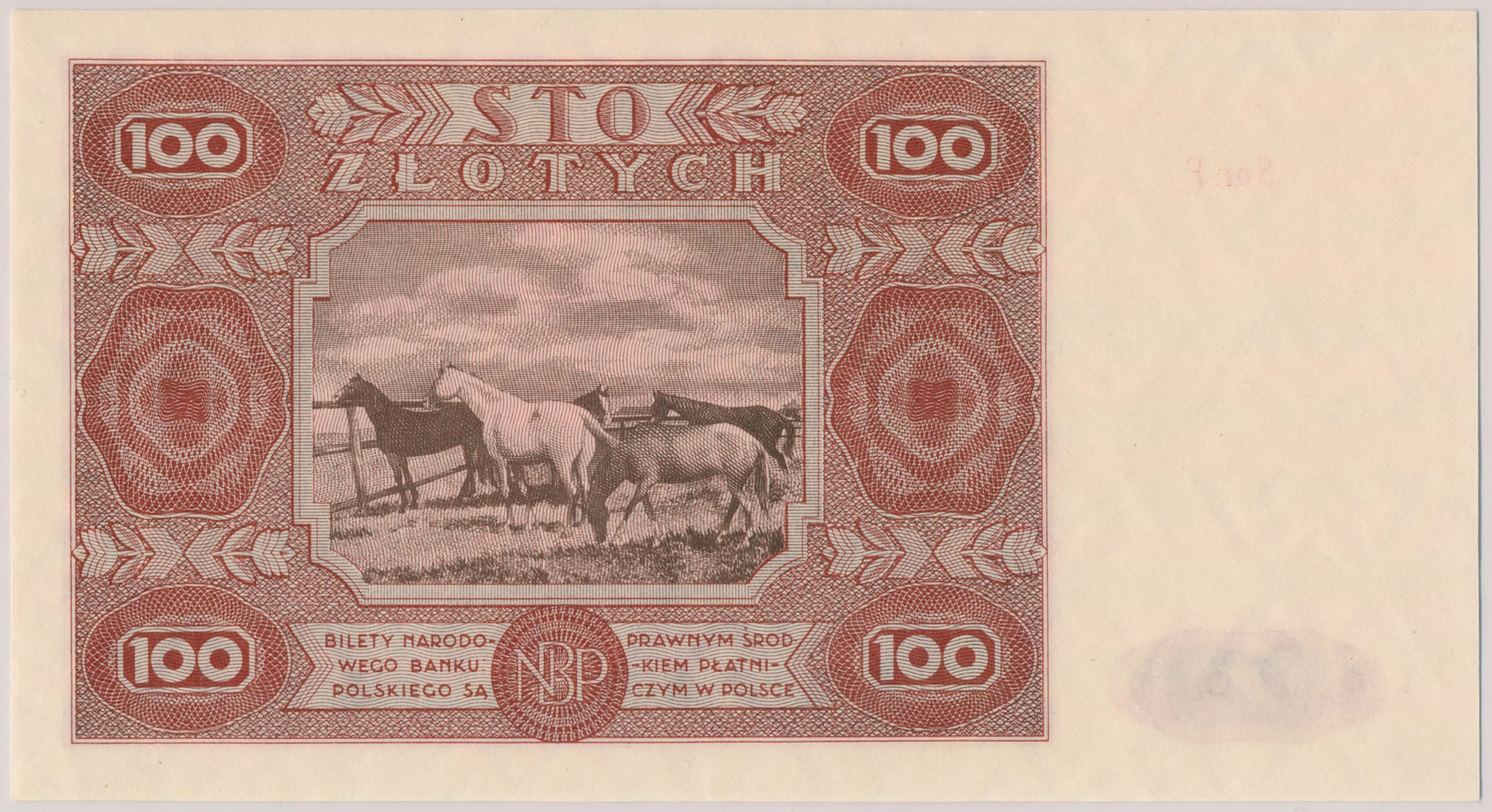
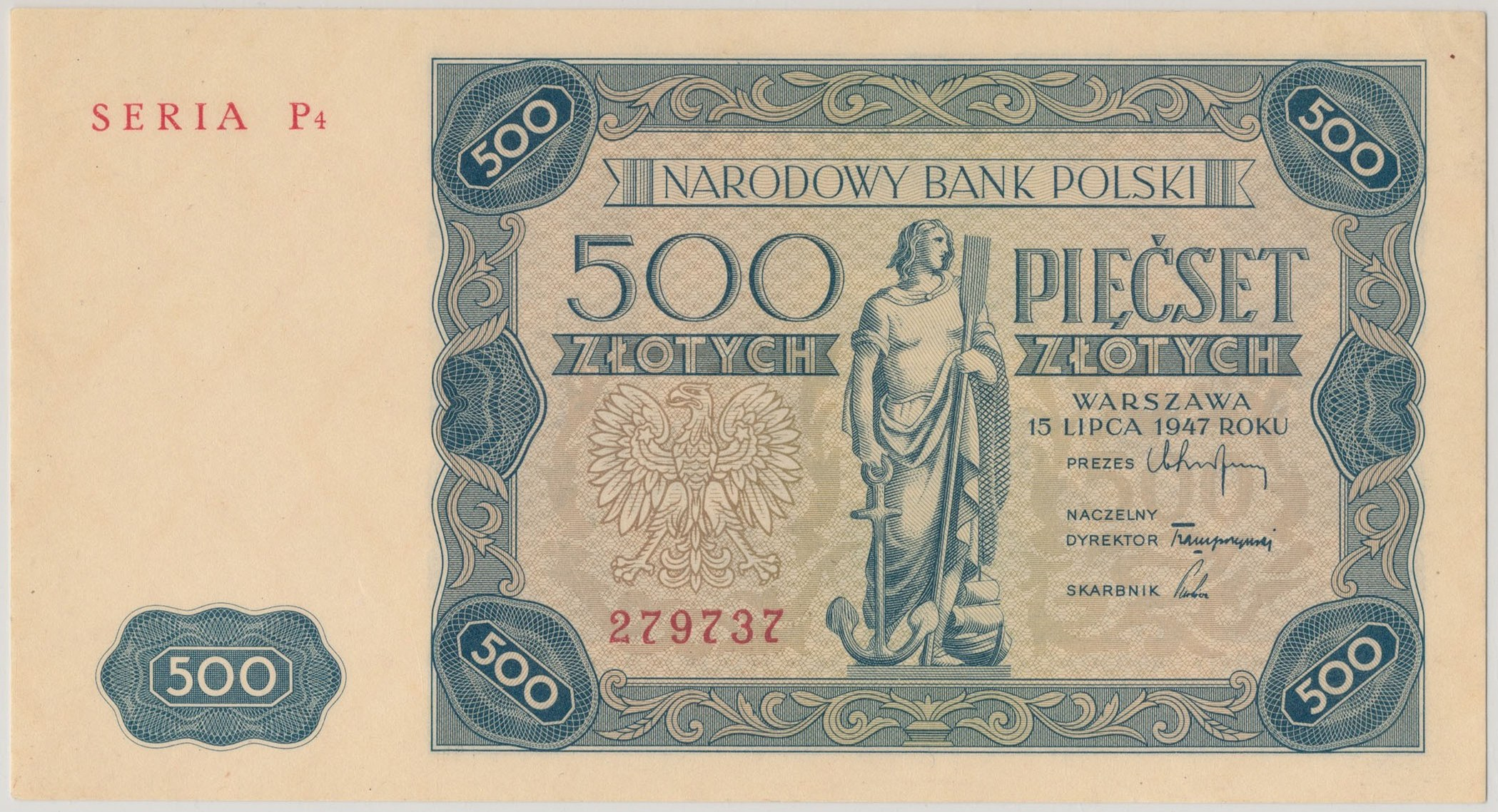
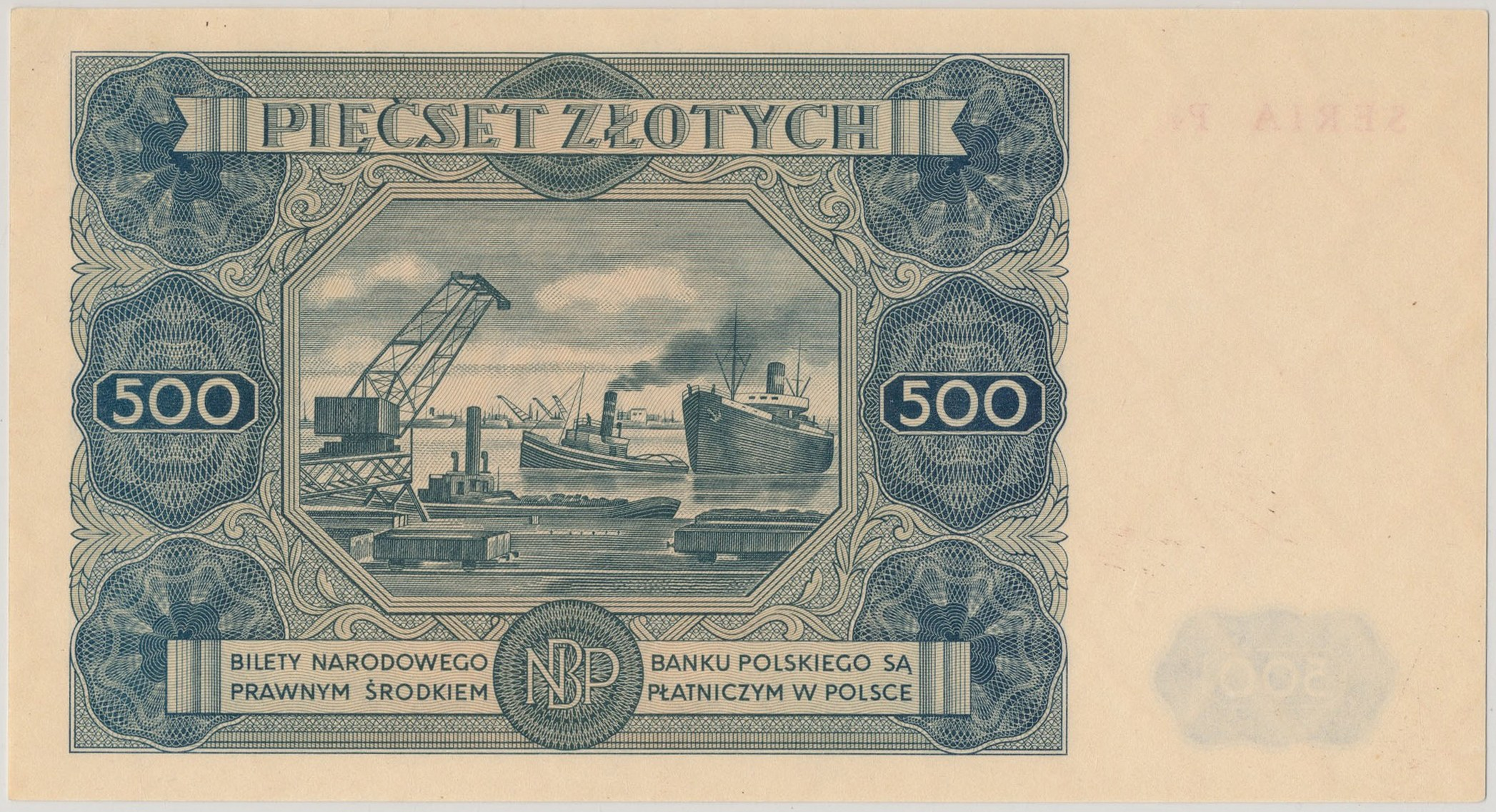
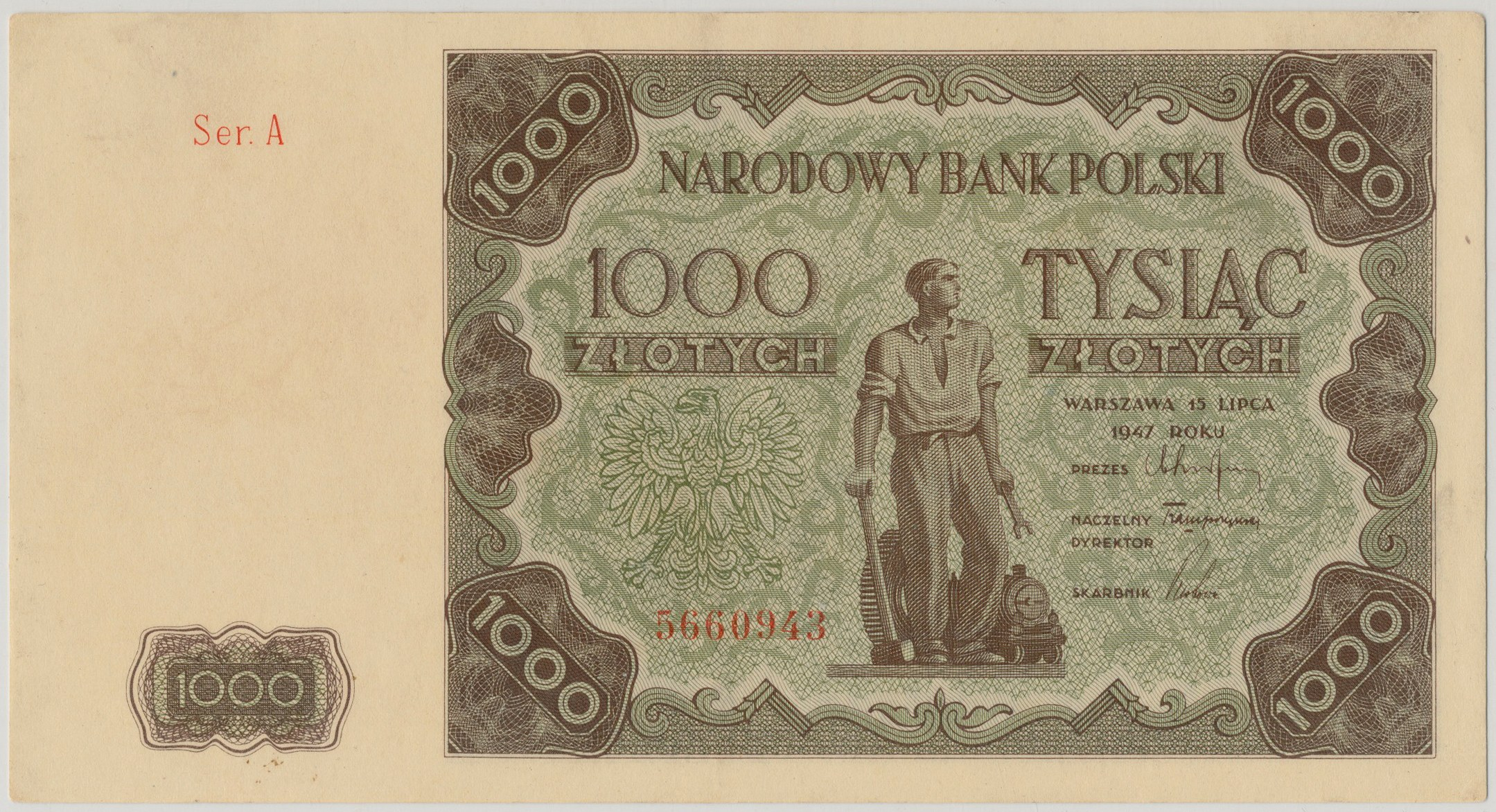
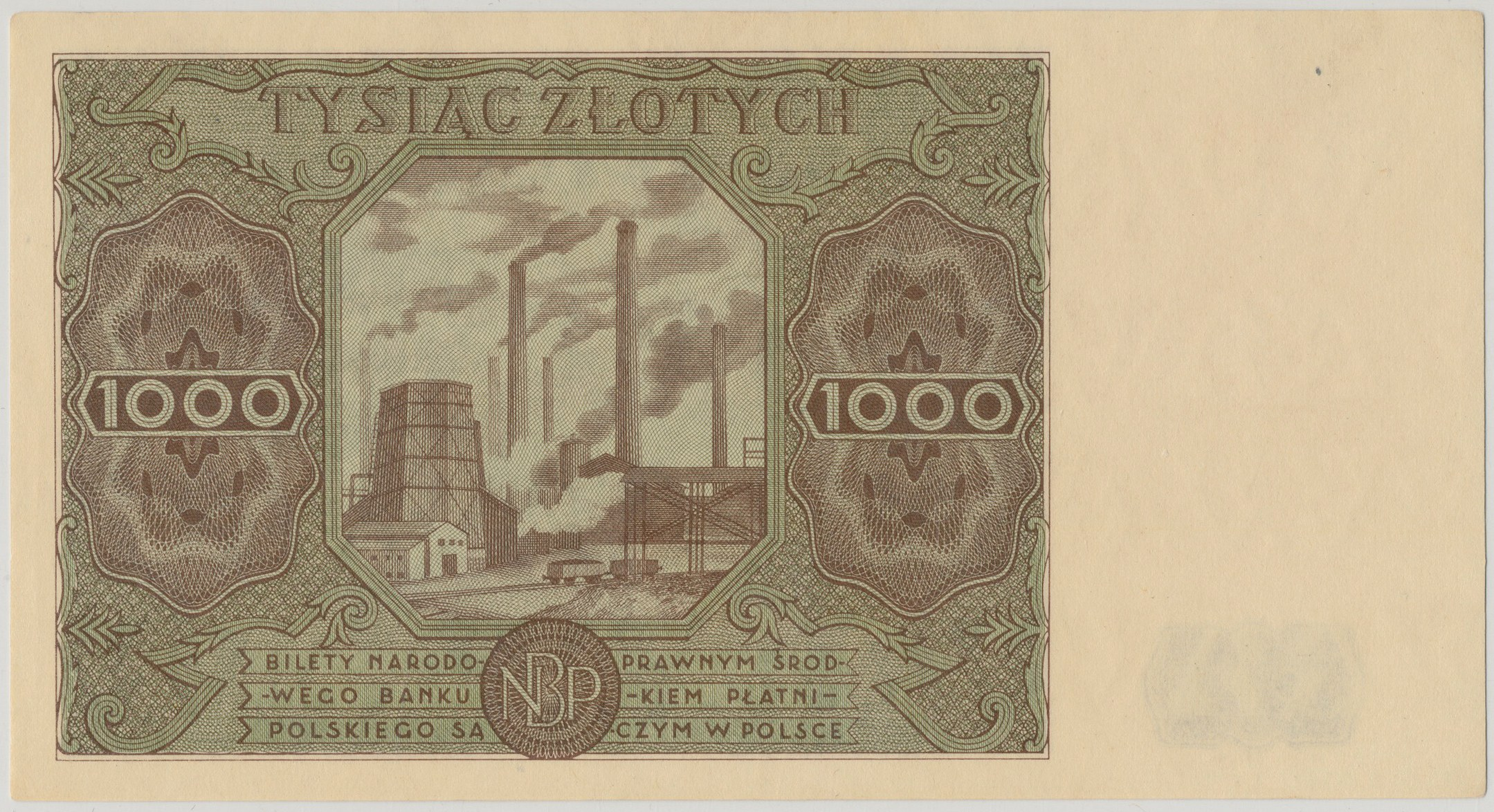
Image	Unit (ZŁ)	Obverse	Reverse
Banknotes (1945-1950)
	20 zł
	100 zł
	500 zł
	1000 zł

=== 1950-currency reform ===
==== Series of 1948 ====
The banknotes of the series of 1948 were designed by Polish painter and decorative artist Wacław Borowski. The introduction of these notes was part of the currency reform of 1950, so the banknotes had to be printed quickly and in secrecy; thus, printing works in Poland (PWPW), Czechoslovakia (STC), Hungary (Pénzjegynyomda), Sweden (Riksbankens Sedeltryckeri), and Canada (British American Bank Note Company Ltd.) were involved.

Series of 1948
Image		Value	Dimensions	Description		Date of			
Obverse	Reverse	Value	Dimensions	Obverse	Reverse	first printing	issue	withdrawal	lapse
		2 zł	120 mm × 58 mm	Face value	The design of the (then) future NBP building at Warsaw Insurgents Square in Warsaw	1 July 1948	30 October 1950	1 January 1960	30 June 1960
		5 zł	142 mm × 67 mm	Face value	Farmer plowing a field with a tractor	1 July 1948	30 October 1950	1 January 1960	30 June 1960
		10 zł	148 mm × 70 mm	Portrait of a peasant (inspired by Mateusz Jóźwiak, the creator of cast printing matrices at PWPW)	Peasants loading sheaves to a ladder wagon.	1 July 1948	30 October 1950	31 December 1965	30 June 1966
		20 zł	160 mm × 76 mm	Portrait of a woman in kerchief (nicknamed "Anielka"; the portrait was supposedly inspired by Helena Michalik (née Bujak), who was a friend of Wacław Borowski)	Kraków Cloth Hall	1 July 1948	30 October 1950	30 June 1977	31 December 1977
		50 zł	164 mm × 78 mm	Portrait of a fisherman	Port of Gdynia	1 July 1948	30 October 1950	30 June 1978	31 December 1978
		100 zł	172 mm × 82 mm	Portrait of a worker (a so-called "Pstrowski"; portrait inspired by Bronisław Tomaszewski, who was a driver at PWPW)	View of a factory with smoking chimneys (probably Łódź)	1 July 1948	30 October 1950	30 June 1977	31 December 1977
		500 zł	178 mm × 85 mm	Portrait of a miner in helmet	Underground mining scene	1 July 1948	30 October 1950	31 December 1977	30 June 1978
These images are to scale at 0.7 pixel per millimetre (18 pixel per inch). For table standards, see the banknote specification table.

==== Series of 1974 ====
The National Bank of Poland began to introduce banknotes with the faces of "Great Poles," and the series was first introduced on 16 December 1974 with the 500 Zloty note. As economic situations worsened, by the 1980s, higher and higher denominations were introduced, and in 1989, the 20,000 was adopted, which was equivalent to half of a wage of that time (65,000 zloty). By the end of 1989, a commemorative note was released into circulation, the 200,000 Zloty banknote, which is rather a numismatic product (which still has a huge price tag even today) than an actual banknote meant for everyday payments/transactions. In 1990, as wages were regulated to the actual value of the currency, new higher-denomination notes were released, such as the 500,000 Zloty note, which was worth 50 dollars, and then it was devalued to 30 dollars when a new exchange rate was finalized to prevent hyperinflation. At the end of 1993, new reworked editions of banknotes (50,000, 100,000, 500,000, one million, and two million zloty) were released, which also erased the old Polish People's Republic name from the 50,000 and 100,000 zloty banknotes in circulation. In 1994, the government stopped printing old Zloty notes in order to establish the Fourth Zloty by 1 January 1995. All of the banknotes together were withdrawn on 31 December 1996 and were no longer exchanged by 2010.

1974 Series
Image		Value	Dimensions	Colour	Obverse	Reverse	Printed	Withdrawn
Obverse	Reverse	Value	Dimensions	Colour	Obverse	Reverse	Printed	Withdrawn
		10 zł	139 x 63 mm	Bluish green	Józef Bem	Indication of value	1982	31 December 1996
		20 zł	139 x 63 mm	Multicoloured	Romuald Traugutt	Indication of value	1982	31 December 1996
		50 zł	139 x 63 mm	Green	Karol Świerczewski	Grunwald Cross Medal	1975,1979,1982, 1986,1988	31 December 1996
		100 zł	139 x 63 mm	Red	Ludwik Waryński	"Proletaryat" (19th century Polish socialist party)	1975,1976, 1979,1982,1986,1988	31 December 1996
		200 zł	139 x 63 mm	Violet	Jarosław Dąbrowski	Monument to the Dead (of the Paris Commune) by Paul Moreau-Vauthier in the Père Lachaise Cemetery	1976, 1979,1986,1988	31 December 1996
		500 zł	139 x 63 mm	Brown	Tadeusz Kościuszko	"Żywią i Bronią" (They feed and defend), flag of Polish soldiers in Kraków during the Kościuszko Uprising	1974,1976,1979,1982	31 December 1996
		1000 zł	139 x 63 mm	Blue	Nicolaus Copernicus	Heliocentric Solar System	1975,1979,1982	31 December 1996
		2000 zł	139 x 63 mm	Brown	Mieszko I	Bolesław I the Brave	1977,1979,1982	31 December 1996
		5000 zł	139 x 63 mm	Green	Frédéric Chopin	Polonaise notes	1982,1986, 1988	31 December 1996
		10 000 zł	139 x 63 mm	Green and violet	Stanisław Wyspiański	Kraków	1987,1988	31 December 1996
		20 000 zł	139 x 63 mm	Orange	Maria Skłodowska-Curie	Nuclear reactor "Ewa" near Warsaw	1989	31 December 1996
		50 000 zł	139 x 63 mm	Brown	Stanisław Staszic	The Staszic Palace in Warsaw	1989,1993	31 December 1996
		100 000 zł	139 x 63 mm	Blue	Stanisław Moniuszko	Teatr Wielki, Warsaw	1990,1993	31 December 1996
		200 000 zł	139 x 63 mm	Brown	Coat of arms	Warsaw	1989	31 December 1996
		500 000 zł	139 x 63 mm	Blue and brown	Henryk Sienkiewicz	"Trilogy"	1990,1993	31 December 1996
		1 000 000 zł	139 x 63 mm	Light brown	Władysław Reymont	Country landscape	1991,1993	31 December 1996
		2 000 000 zł	139 x 63 mm	Multicoloured	Ignacy Jan Paderewski	The 1919 Coat of arms of Poland	1992,1993	31 December 1996
These images are to scale at 0.7 pixels per millimeter, a standard for world banknotes.

== See also ==
- Polish coins and banknotes
- Polish złoty
