= 1000-złoty note =

Banknote used in Poland

The Polish 1,000-złoty note is a formal banknote used in Poland from 1794 to 1996, but plans exist to revive this note to Polish currency, during the third banknote series. On the obverse, it features the numeral 1000 and the text tysiąc złotych 'one thousand złotych'. Along with some other common third-series features, it shows Nicolaus Copernicus. On the reverse, it shows the Solar System, representing Copernicus' heliocentric discovery that the Sun is at the center; it also shows a Solar System symbol.

== History ==
=== 1794 treasury banknotes ===
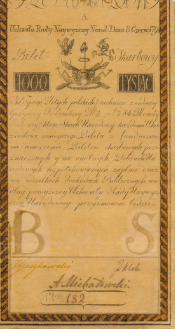
The first 1,000-złoty bill.

The 1,000-złoty bill dates back to 1794, when the original 5-, 10-, 25, 50-, 100-, 500-, and 1,000-złoty banknotes were issued. It was the highest banknote during that time and featured a yellow background, a description, the value of the bill, and the signature of Aleksander Michałowski.

=== 1919 reintroduction to the złoty ===
In 1919/1924, Poland reintroduced the złoty, including a 1,000-złoty bill, followed by a 5,000-złoty bill.

On the obverse, the 1,000-złoty bill features a gray background, an image of Tadeusz Kościuszko, the value of the note, and an empty circle. On the reverse, it features the Polish eagle, and elements of the front.

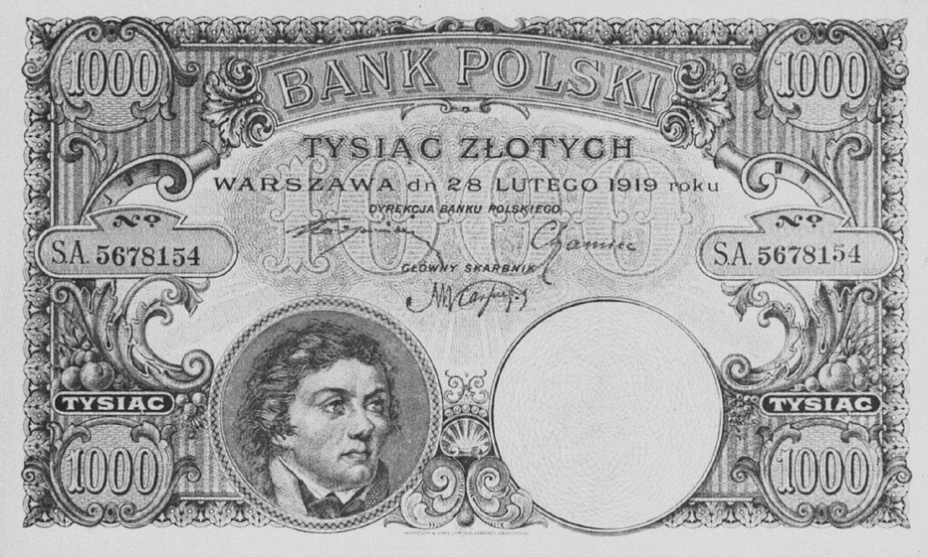
Obverse of the 1919 1,000-złoty note

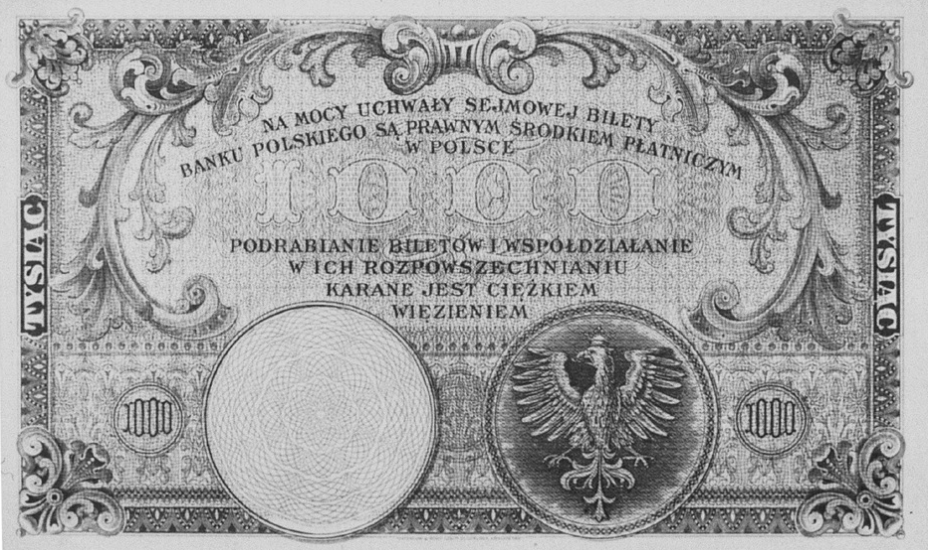
Reverse of the 1919 1,000-złoty note

=== Future of the bill ===
The National Bank of Poland announced in 2021 that in the near future that they would start producing a new 1,000-złoty bill, but work on the project was not started.
