= Polish złoty =

Currency of Poland

polski złoty (Polish) zł
- 5-złoty coin obverse

ISO 4217
- Code: PLN (numeric: 985)
- Subunit: 0.01

Units of account
- Base unit: złoty
- Plural: See Name and plural forms
- Symbol: zł
- Subunit
- 1/100: grosz
- Symbol
- grosz: gr

Denominations
- Banknotes: 10 zł, 20 zł, 50 zł, 100 zł, 200 zł, 500 zł
- Coins: 1 gr, 2 gr, 5 gr, 10 gr, 20 gr, 50 gr, 1 zł, 2 zł, 5 zł

Demographics
- Replaced: Polish marka
- User(s): Poland

Issuance
- Central bank: National Bank of Poland
- Website: www.nbp.pl
- Mint: Polish Security Printing Works; Mennica Polska
- Website: www.pwpw.pl; www.mennica.com.pl

Valuation
- Inflation: 3.2% (April 2026)
- Method: CPI

The złoty (alternative spelling: zloty; Polish: polski złoty, pronounced [ˈzwɔtɨ]; (Note: The nominative plural, used for numbers ending in 2, 3 and 4 (except those in 12, 13 and 14), is złote [ˈzwɔtɛ]; the genitive plural, used for all other numbers, is złotych [ˈzwɔtɨx]) abbreviation: zł; code: PLN), (Note: Prior to 1995, code PLZ was used instead.) is the official currency and legal tender of Poland. It is subdivided into 100 groszy (gr). (Note: Singular: grosz, alternative plural forms: groszy, grosze.) It is the most-traded currency in Central and Eastern Europe and ranks 20th most-traded in the foreign exchange market.

The word złoty is a masculine form of the Polish adjective 'golden', which closely relates with its name to the guilder, whereas the grosz subunit is based on the groschen, cognate to the English word groat. It was officially introduced to replace its interim predecessor, the Polish marka, on 28 February 1919 and began circulation in 1924. The only bodies permitted to manufacture or mint złoty coins and banknotes are the Polish Security Printing Works, founded in Warsaw on 25 January 1919, and Mennica Polska, founded in Warsaw on 10 February 1766.

As a result of inflation in the early 1990s, the currency underwent redenomination. Thus, on 1 January 1995, 10,000 old złoty (PLZ) became one new złoty (PLN). As a member of the European Union, Poland is obliged to adopt the euro when all specific conditions are met; however, there is no time limit for fulfilling all of them. (See Poland and the euro.)

Currently, Poland is not in the European Exchange Rate Mechanism (ERM II).

== Name and plural forms ==
The term "złoty" is an adjective derived from the noun "złoto", which in the Polish language denotes gold. A literal translation of the currency's name would be "golden" or "the golden one". There are two plural forms – złote [ˈzwɔtɛ] as well as złotych [ˈzwɔtɨx], and their correct usage is as follows:

- 1 – złoty [ˈzwɔtɨ] or grosz [ˈɡrɔʂ]
- 2...4; 22...24; 32...34 (...), 102...104, 122...124, 132...134, (...) – złote [ˈzwɔtɛ] or grosze [ˈɡrɔʂɛ]
- 0, 5...21; 25...31; 35...41 (...); 95...101; 105...121; 125...131; (...) – złotych [ˈzwɔtɨx] or groszy [ˈɡrɔʂɨ]

Fractions should be rendered with złotego [zwɔˈtɛɡɔ] and grosza [ˈɡrɔʂa], for example 0.1 złotego; 2.5 złotego and so on.

Native English speakers or English-language sources tend to avoid the complexity of plural forms and in turn use "złoty" for all denominations, for instance 2 złoty and 100 zloty (or zlotys) instead of 2 złote and 100 złotych.

== Symbol ==
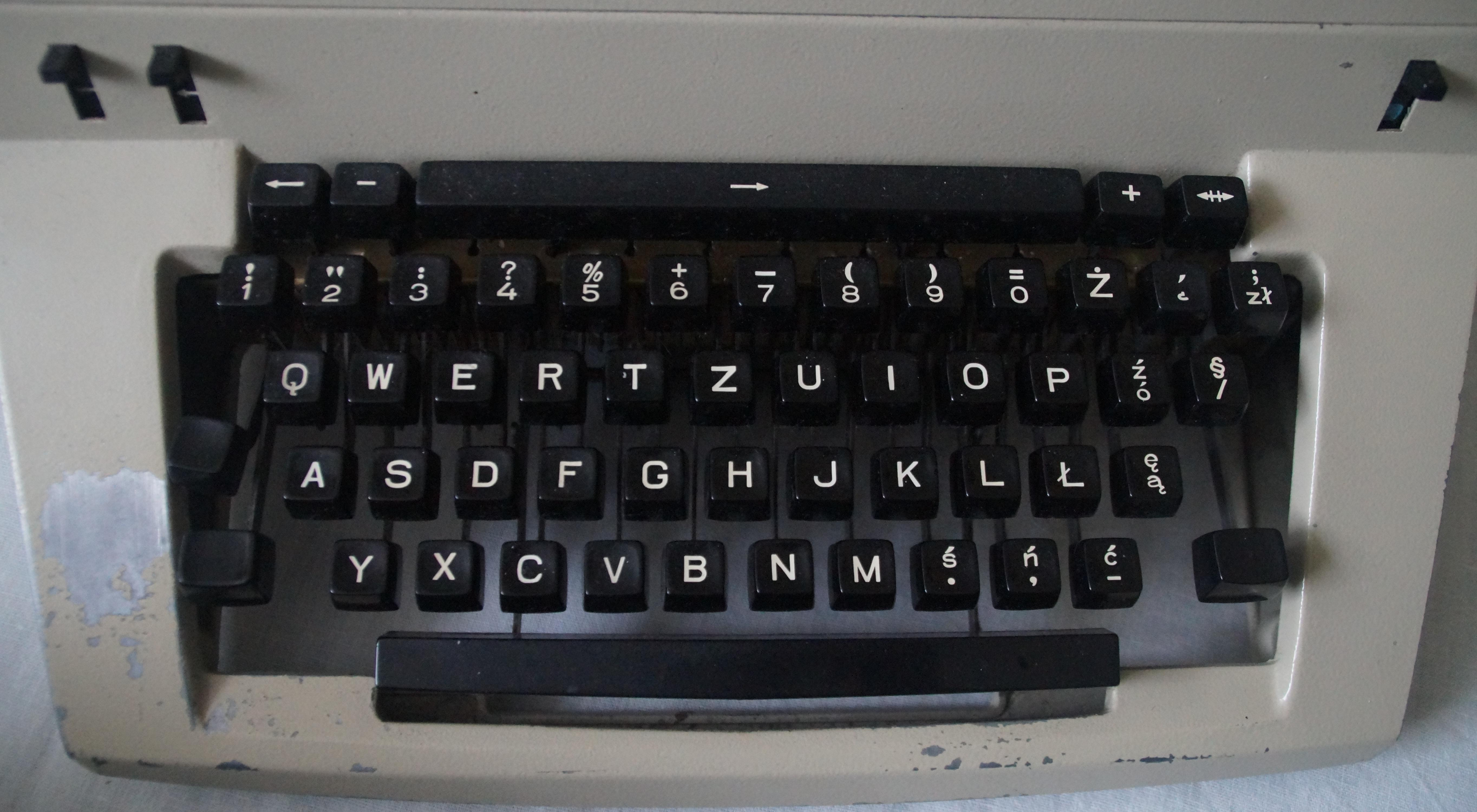
Keyboard of Łucznik 1016 typewriter with zł key (shared with ; symbol) in the top row.

The official currency symbol is zł, composed of lowercase z and ł which are the two first letters of "złoty". It has no representation in the Unicode Standard as a single sign, but previously had representation in Polish typewriters and computers. The symbol of the "grosz" subunit is represented by lowercase gr.

== History ==
=== First złoty ===
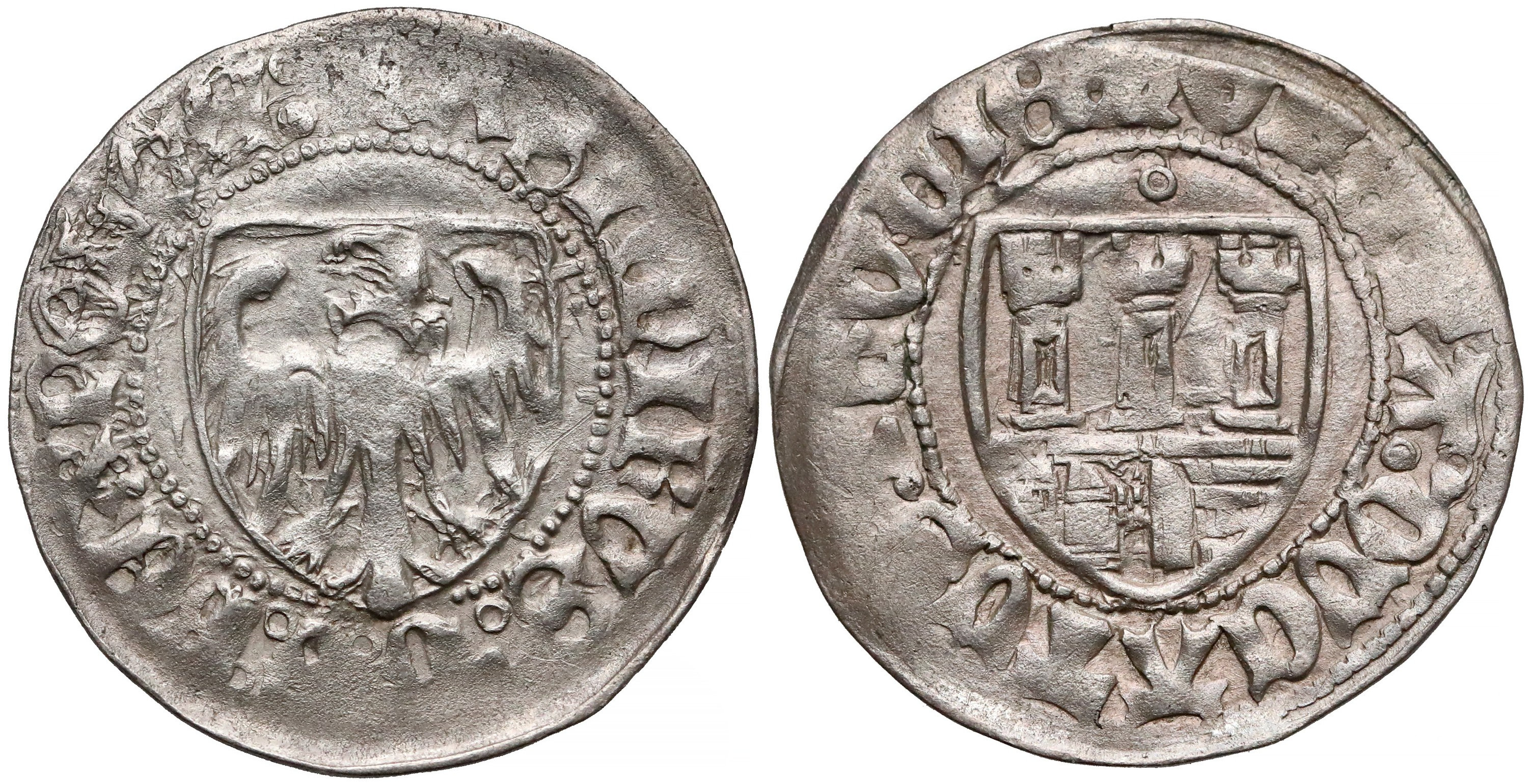
A 15th-century denar featuring the Polish white eagle, minted in Toruń

The first form of tangible currency in Poland was the denarius (denar), which began circulating in the 10th century. During this period, Polish coinage had a single face value and was minted from bullion (primarily silver, but also compounded with copper and other precious metals). The standard unit of mass used at the time was the grzywna rather than the pound, with one grzywna being equivalent to 240 denars. From the 1300s to the mid-16th century, the Prague groschen (or groat) dominated the market and its high supply reduced the demand for a national currency across Central Europe. Certain cities and autonomous regions of the Polish Kingdom held the privilege of minting their own currency, for instance the shilling (szeląg) in the Duchy of Prussia, which Poland co-adopted in 1526.

Initially, the term "złoty" (lit. 'the golden one') was used in the 14th and 15th centuries for a number of foreign gold coins, most notably Venetian ducats, florins and guldens. In 1496, the Sejm parliament debated on the creation of a domestic currency and approved the złoty, which until then acted as a unit of account. An exchange rate of 30 grosz was imposed for one gold piece, which remained the traditional subdivision until the 19th century. In the years 1526–1535, as part of an extensive monetary reform proposed by Nicolaus Copernicus and Justus Decius, King Sigismund I defined the złoty as a legal tender in the minting ordinance on 16 February 1528.

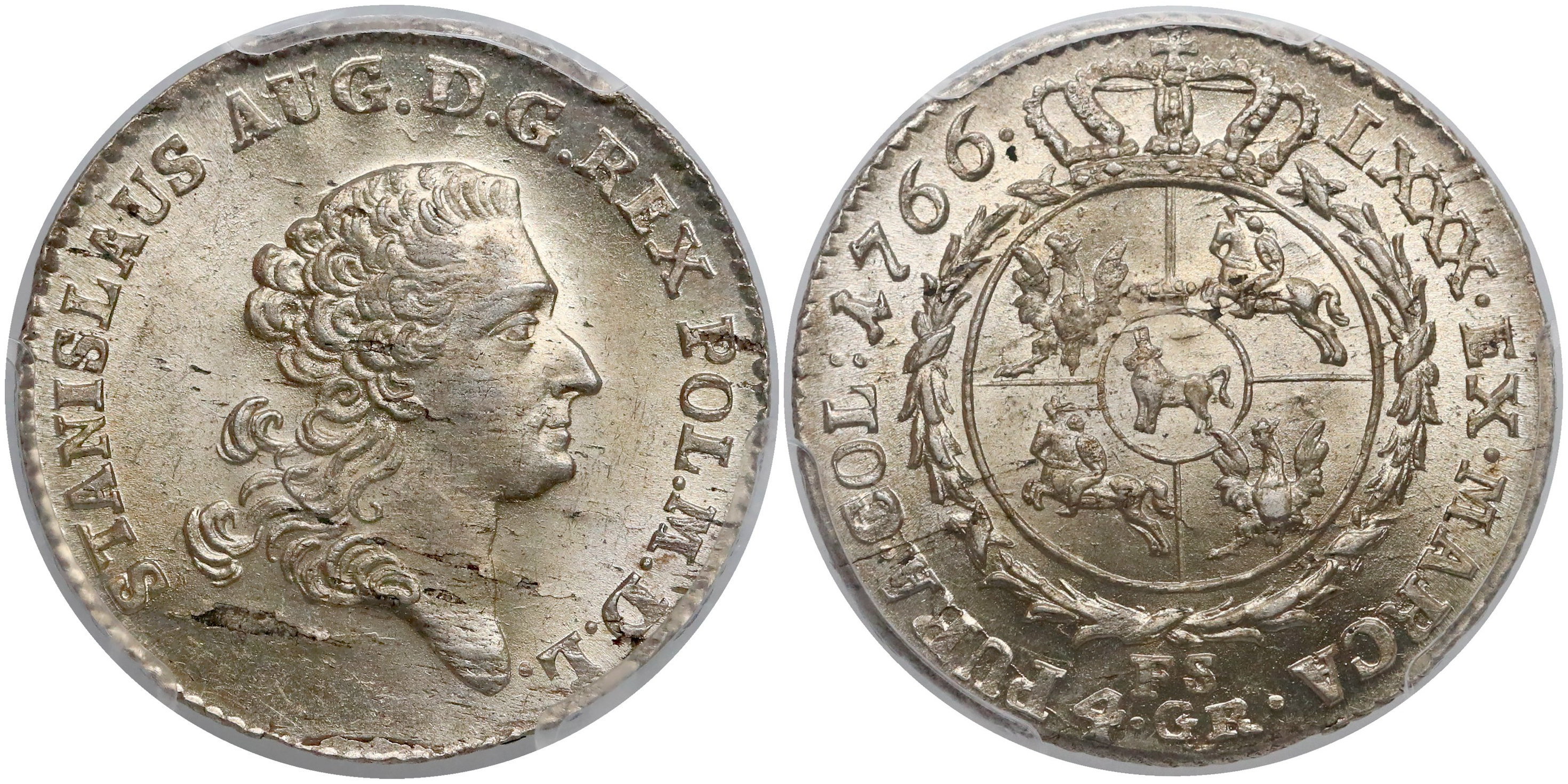
Złoty coin featuring the profile of Stanisław II Augustus, 1766

The Polish monetary system remained complex and intricate from the 16th to 18th centuries until a monetary reform enacted by Stanisław II Augustus which removed all other monetary units except the złoty, which was divided into 30 groszy. Polish currency was then linked to that of the Holy Roman Empire by setting the Conventionsthaler = 8 złoty = 23.3856 g fine silver and the North German thaler = 6 złoty = 17.5392 g silver (hence 2.9232 g silver in a złoty).

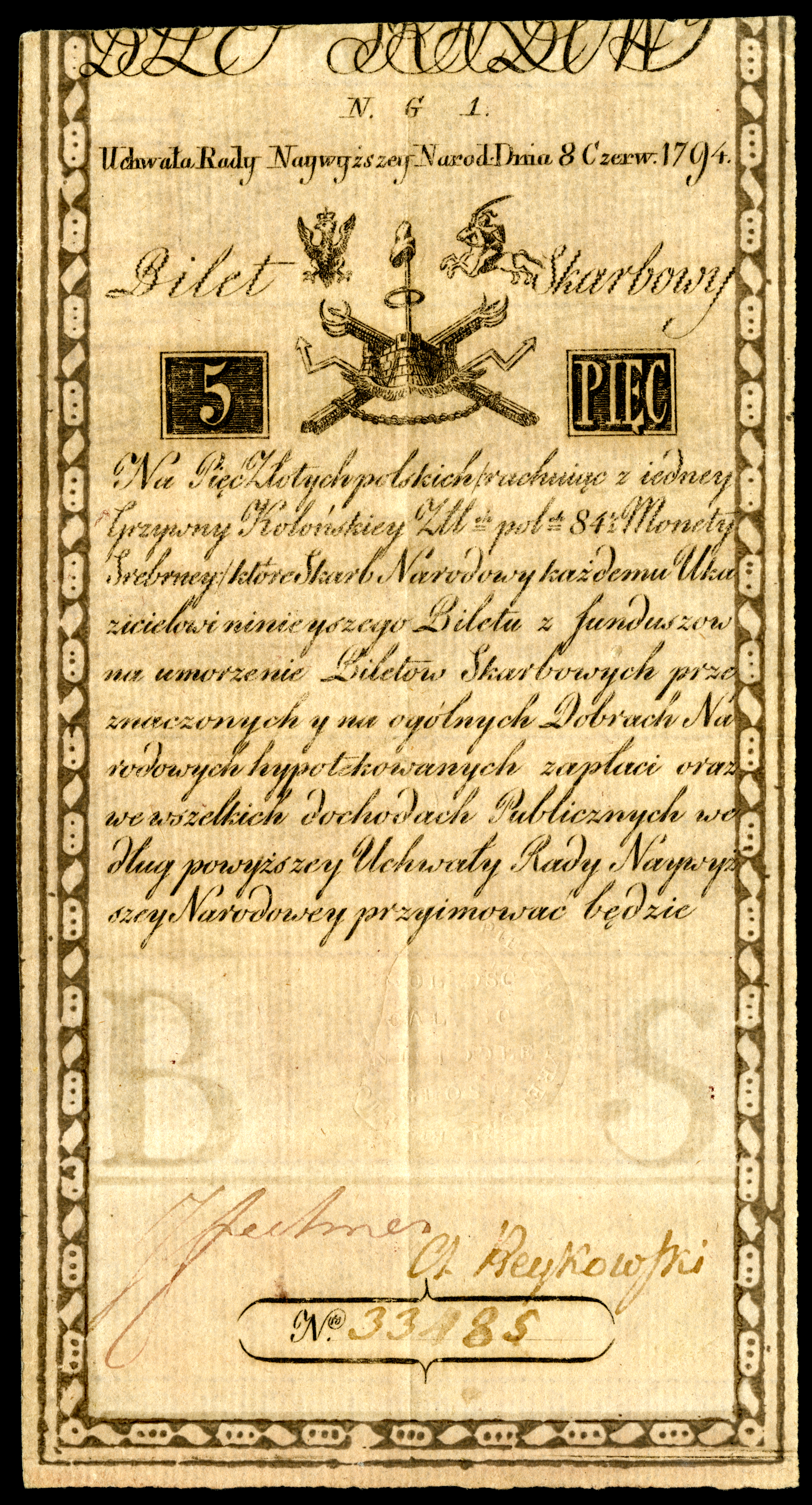
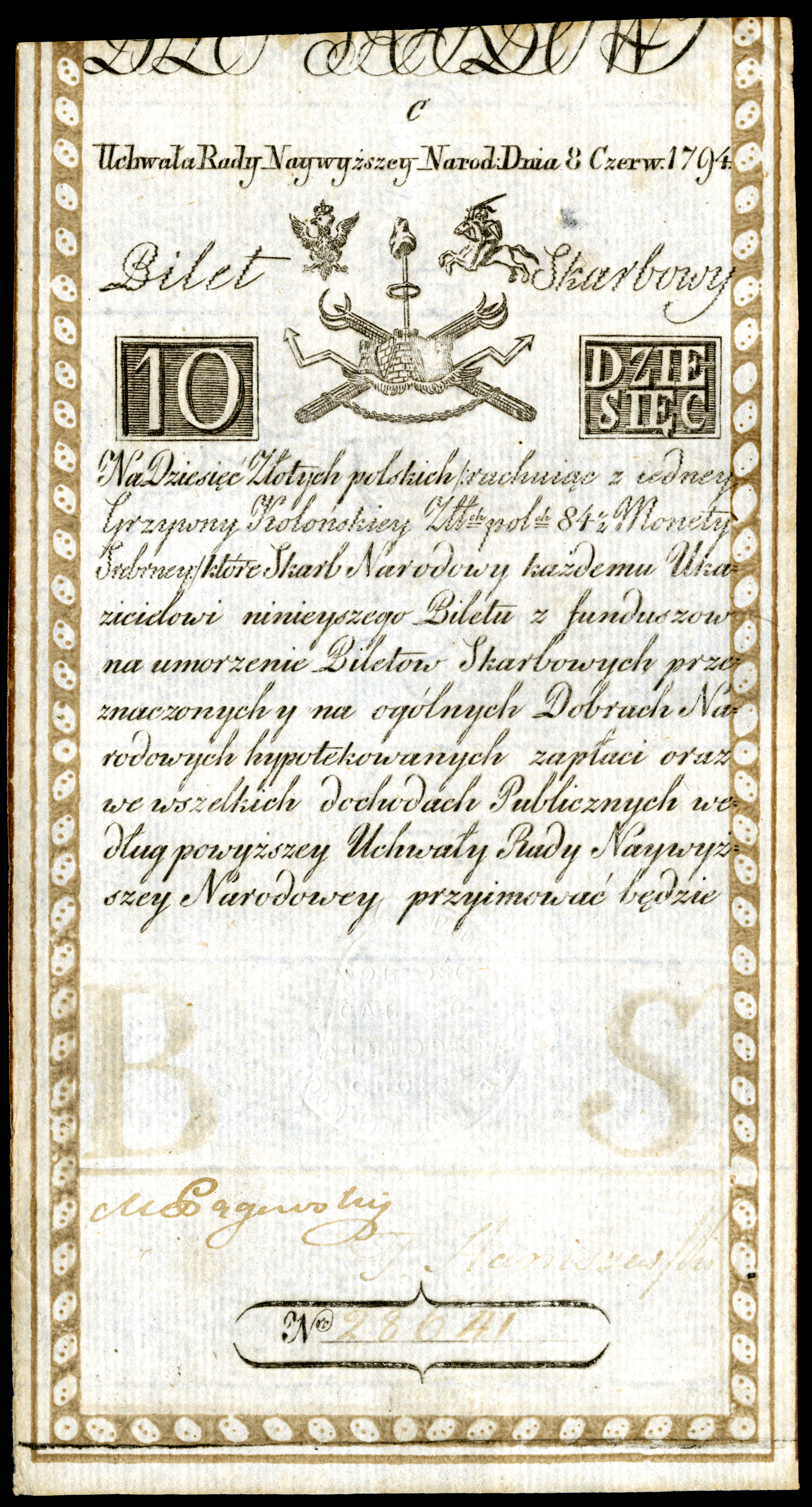
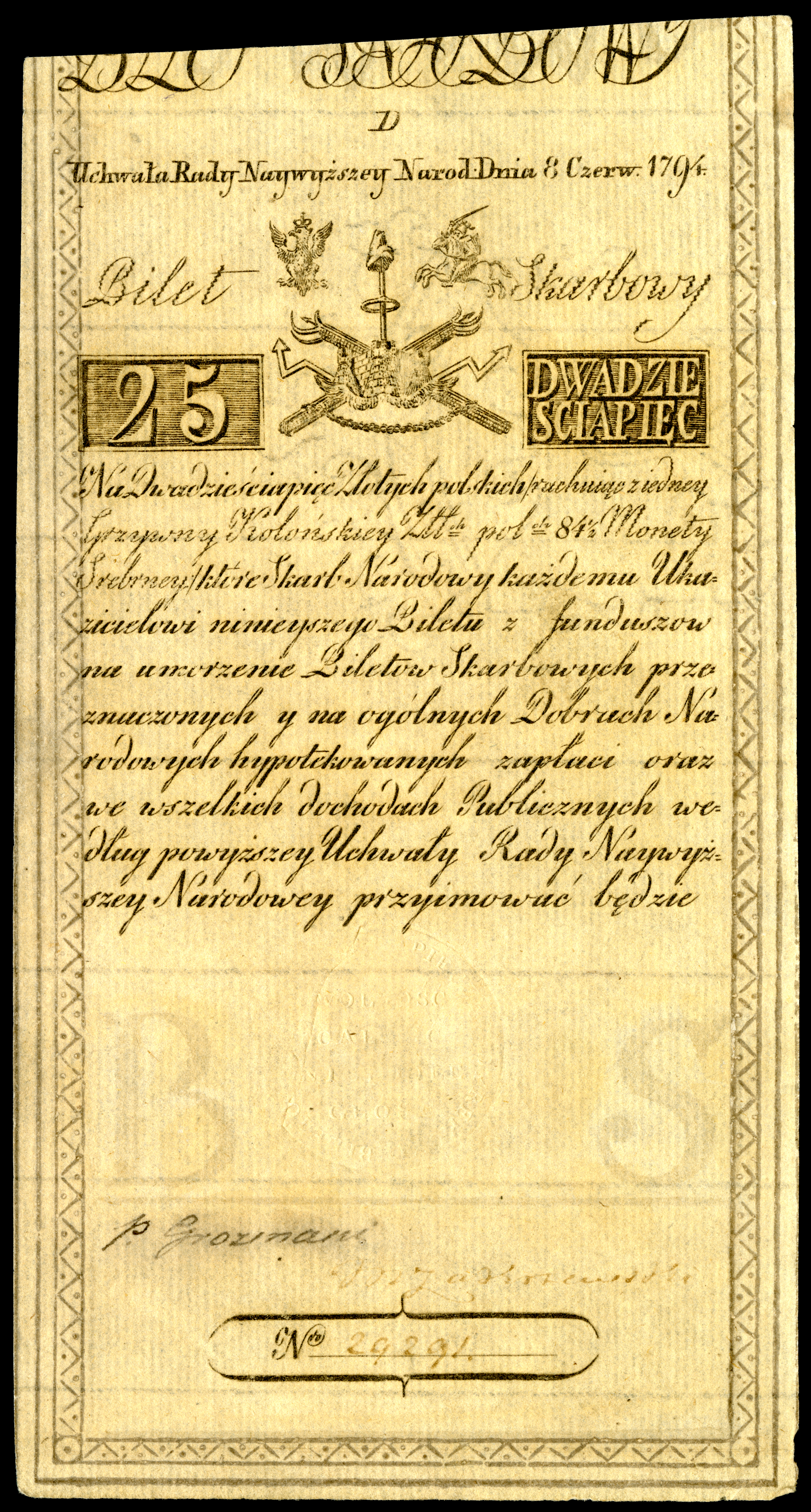
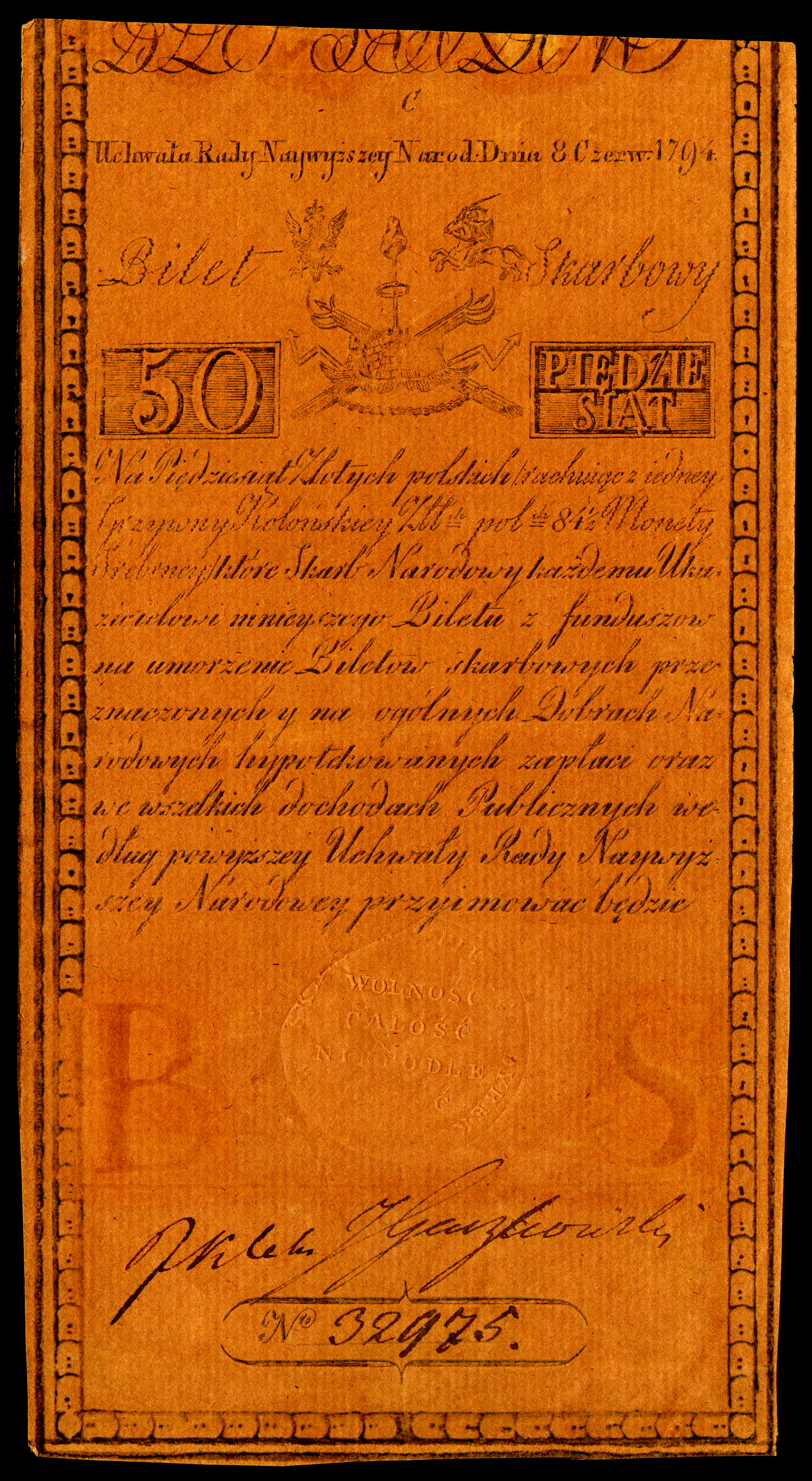
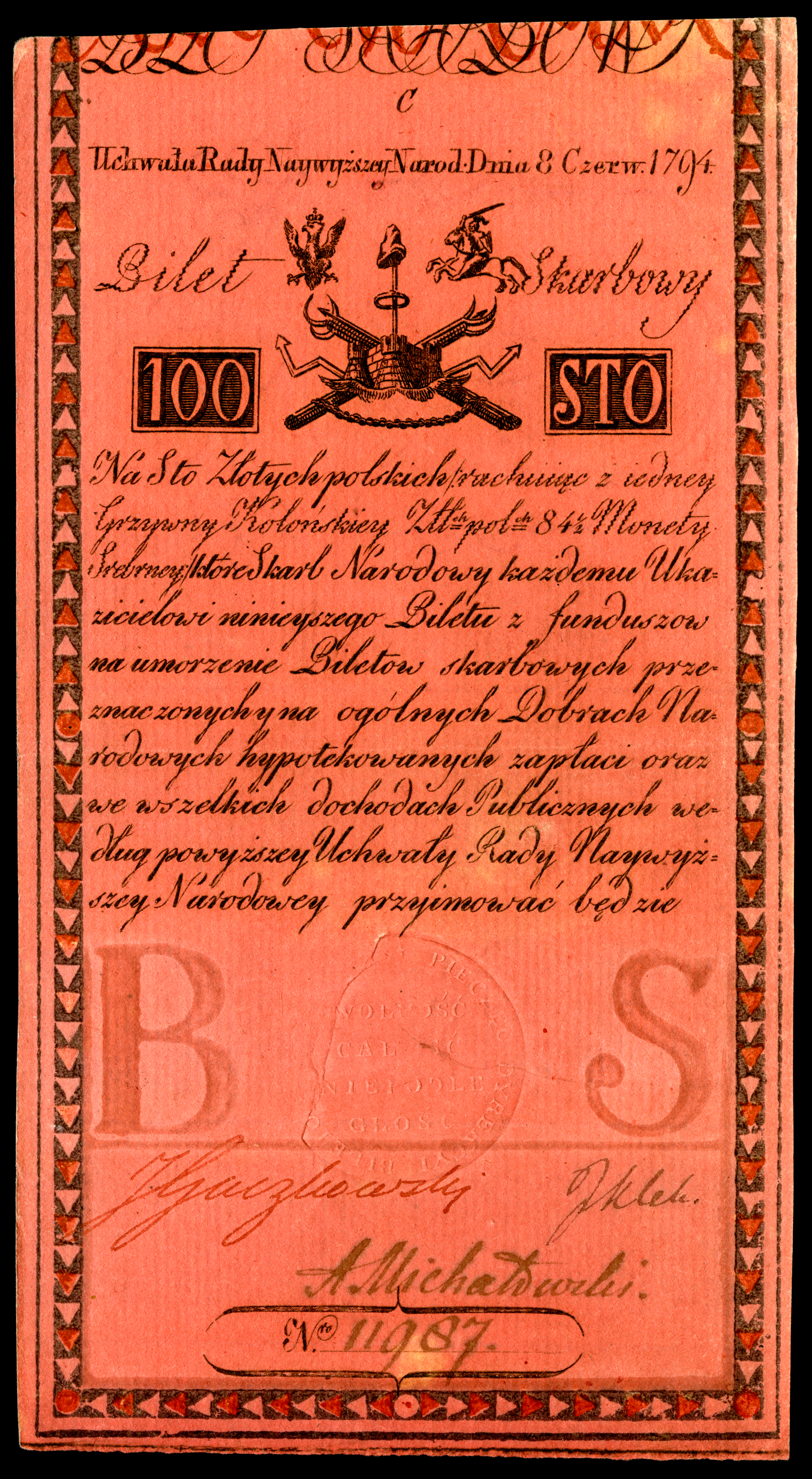
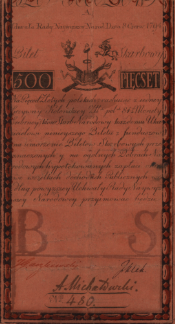
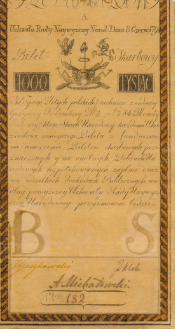
The Polish–Lithuanian Commonwealth first issued złoty banknotes on 8 June 1794 under the authority of Tadeusz Kościuszko. The 5, 10, 25, 50, 100, 500, 1000 złotych are depicted above.

Radical changes to the currency were made during the Kościuszko Uprising. The second partition of the vast Polish–Lithuanian Commonwealth resulted in the loss of approximately 200,000 square kilometres (77,000 sq mi) of land and precipitated an economic collapse. The widespread shortage of funds to finance the defense of remaining territories forced the insurrectionist government to look for alternatives. In June 1794, Tadeusz Kościuszko began printing paper money and issuing first Polish banknotes as a substitute for coinage, which could not be minted in required quantities. These entered circulation on 13 August 1794.

The złoty remained in circulation after the Partitions of Poland and Napoleon's Duchy of Warsaw issued coins denominated in grosz, złoty and talars, with the talar (thaler) of 6 złoty slightly reduced in value to the Prussian thaler of 16.704 g fine silver (hence 2.784 g silver in a złoty). Talar banknotes were also issued. In 1813, while Zamość was under siege, the town authorities issued 6 grosz and 2 złoty coins. Following the 1815 Congress of Vienna, Austrian and Russian sectors of partitioned Poland continued to use the złoty for some time, while the German sector replaced the talar and złoty with the Prussian thaler and later, the German gold mark.

On 19 November O.S. (1 December N.S.) 1815, the law regarding the monetary system of Congress Poland (in Russia) was passed, which pegged the złoty at 15 kopecks (0.15 Imperial roubles, or almost 2.7 g fine silver) and the groszy at 1/2 kopeck, and with silver 1, 2, 5 and 10 złotych coins issued from 1816 to 1855.

At the time of the 1830 November Uprising, the insurrectionists issued their own "rebel money" – golden ducats and silver coins in the denomination of 2 and 5 złoty, with the revolutionary coat of arms, and the copper 3 and 10 grosz. These coins continued to be traded long after the uprising was quelled. As a consequence of the uprising, the rubel became the sole legal tender of Congress Poland from 1842, although coins marked as złoty in parallel with ruble were minted in Warsaw until 1865 and remained legal until 1890. In 1892, the Austro-Hungarian krone was introduced in Austrian Galicia. Between 1835 and 1846, the Free City of Kraków also used its own independent currency, the Kraków złoty (minted in Vienna), which remained legal until 1857.

During World War I, the rouble and krone were replaced by the Polish marka, a currency initially equivalent to the German mark. The marka remained in use after Poland regained its independence in 1918, but was extremely unstable, disrupted the whole economy, and triggered galloping inflation.

=== Second złoty ===
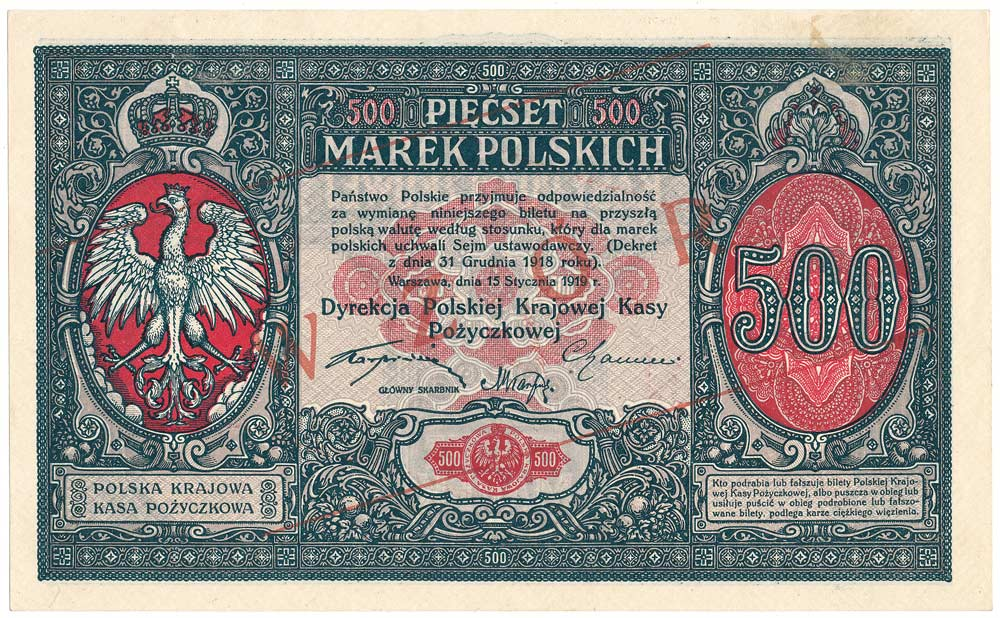
The złoty was reintroduced in 1924 and replaced the marka (Mp 500 banknote pictured above).

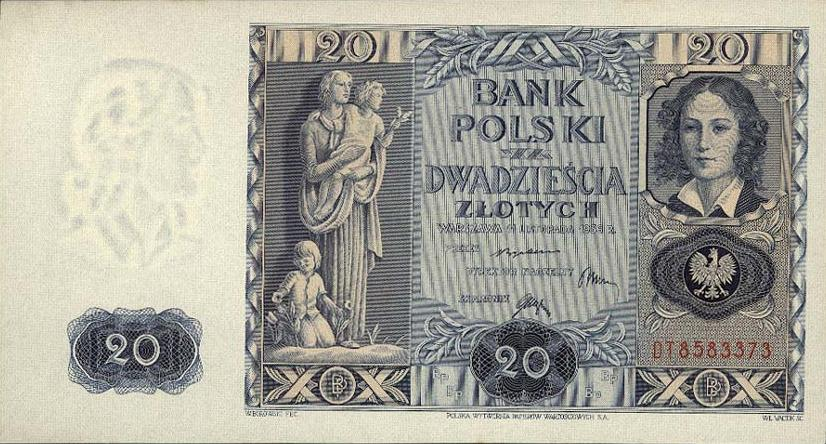
A 20-złotych banknote featuring Emilia Plater from 1936.

The złoty was reintroduced by the Minister of Finance, Władysław Grabski, in April 1924. It replaced the marka at a rate of 1 złoty to 1,800,000 marks and was subdivided into 100 grosz rather than the traditional 30 grosz.

Following its inauguration, the second złoty was pegged to the United States dollar through a stabilization loan provided by the Federal Reserve Bank of New York. The budget deficit ballooned and out-of-control inflation ensued. The złoty began to stabilise in 1926 (chiefly due to significant exports of coal), and was re-set on the dollar-złoty rate 50% higher than in 1924. Up until 1933, the złoty was freely exchanged into gold and foreign currency. Based on these developments, the Polish government made the decision to adopt the gold standard and maintain it for a significant period to attract global investors.

Under the occupation during World War II, the Germans created an Emissary Bank (Bank Emisyjny) in Kraków, as Polish bank officials fled to Paris in France. It started operating on 8 April 1940, and in May, old banknotes from 1924 to 1939 were overstamped by the new entity. Money exchange was limited per individual; the limits varied according to the status of the person. The fixed exchange rate was 2 złoty per 1 Reichsmark. A new issue of notes appeared in the years 1940–1941.

On 15 January 1945, the National Bank of Poland was formed, and a new printing plant opened in Łódź. The series II and III notes were designed by Ryszard Kleczewski and Wacław Borowski. The first three series were taken out of circulation in line with legislation signed on 28 October 1950, covering the introduction of a new złoty with a revived coinage system.

=== Third złoty (PLZ) ===
In 1950, the third złoty (PLZ) was introduced, replacing all notes issued up to 1948 at a rate of one hundred to one, while all bank assets were re-denominated in the ratio 100:3. The new banknotes were dated 1948, while the new coins were dated 1949. Initially, by law with effect from 1950, 1 złoty was worth 0.222168 grams of pure gold. The banknotes were issued in denominations ranging from 10 zlotych to 2 million zlotych.

=== Fourth złoty (PLN) ===
After the fall of communism in 1989 and resulting hyperinflation in 1990, the złoty was again redenominated. On 11 May 1994, a redenomination project from the NBP was approved; the act allowing the project to come into force was ratified on 7 July 1994. Thus, on 1 January 1995, the PLN was introduced at a rate of 1 PLN to 10,000 PLZ. Redesigned coins and banknotes were released featuring Polish monarchs, which were printed by De La Rue in London (until 1997) and PWPW in Warsaw (from 1997).

Between 2013 and 2014, the banknotes received additional security features. The design does not differ greatly from the original 1994 series, but is distinguishable by the added white-coloured field with a watermark on the obverse. The updated notes also possess randomly arranged dotting, which are part of the EURion constellation.

On 10 February 2017, a 500-złotych banknote with the likeness of John III Sobieski began circulating. On 2 October 2019, the commemorative 19 złotych note was released. In 2021, Adam Glapiński, president of the National Bank of Poland, announced that a 1,000-złotych note would be introduced in the near future, but the project was cancelled in 2024.

=== Future of the złoty ===
One of the conditions of Poland joining the European Union in May 2004 obliges the country to eventually adopt the euro, though not at any specific date and only after Poland meets the necessary stability criteria; serious discussions regarding joining the Eurozone have ensued. An amendment to Article 227 of the Constitution of the Republic of Poland, which cedes the exclusive right to issue money to the Bank of Poland, will be required. Public opinion remains skeptical about adopting the euro; a 1 January 2026 opinion poll found that 72% of respondents disapprove of adopting euro. As of the beginning of 2026, Poland has not yet begun the process of switching to the euro.

== Banknotes ==
The banknotes range from 120 to 150 millimetres in length and from 60 to 75 millimetres in width. The length increases by 6mm and the width by 3mm with every higher denomination. The obverse features the left profile of a Polish monarch clothed in armour or royal regalia; the sovereigns are arranged chronologically based on the period of reign. The reverse illustrates important landmarks, early coinage or important objects from Poland's history. Architectural elements comprising portals, columns, windows or flower motifs are scattered throughout each banknote, both on the obverse and on the reverse. Predominant colours used include shades of brown, pink or purple, blue, green, and gold. Face value is given in numerals in the upper-left and upper-right corners on the obverse, and in the upper-right corner on the reverse. The written form of the nominal value is embedded vertically on the obverse and horizontally on the reverse.

The notes are adorned by the eagle charge from the Polish coat of arms, along with signatures of the President and General Treasurer of NBP – the National Bank of Poland.

Banknotes of Poland, 1994, 2016 series
Value	Dimensions	Main colours and shades	Obverse	Reverse	Series	Circulation
10 złotych	120 × 60 mm	Brown, green	Mieszko I	Denarius coin Romanesque columns from the Tyniec Abbey	1994, 2012	1 January 1995, 7 April 2014
20 złotych	126 × 63 mm	Pink, purple	Boleslaus I the Brave	Denarius coin Rotunda of Saint Nicolas and a fragment of Gniezno Doors	1994, 2012	1 January 1995, 7 April 2014
50 złotych	132 × 66 mm	Blue	Casimir III the Great	Polish white eagle with royal regalia Kraków and Kazimierz by Hartmann Schedel	1994, 2012	1 January 1995, 7 April 2014
100 złotych	138 × 69 mm	Green	Władysław II Jagiełło	Polish white eagle with Grunwald swords and Teutonic armour Malbork Castle	1994, 2012	1 January 1995, 7 April 2014
200 złotych	144 × 72 mm	Gold, yellow	Sigismund I the Old	Polish white eagle from the Sigismund's Chapel; Wawel Castle	1994, 2015	1 January 1995, 12 February 2016
500 złotych	150 × 75 mm	Light blue, pink, gold and brown	John III Sobieski	Polish white eagle Wilanów Palace	2016	10 February 2017

== Exchange rates ==
The cost of one euro in złoty (from 1999)

Year	USD	EUR	DEM	GBP	CHF	JPY
1990	9500.00	12104.35	5866.24	16930.35	6851.32	65.92
1991	10584.26	13088.29	6378.62	18652.81	7379.05	78.72
1992	13630.12	17662.35	8761.56	24009.90	9742.76	107.78
1993	18164.84	21204.91	10975.20	27274.86	12308.00	164.50
1994	22726.95	26943.26	14049.60	34805.35	16670.93	222.68
Re-denomination (10000:1)
1995	2.4244	3.1358	1.6928	3.8245	2.0515	0.0259
1996	2.6965	3.3757	1.7920	4.2095	2.1830	0.0248
1997	3.2808	3.7032	1.8918	5.3735	2.2609	0.0272
1998	3.4937	3.9227	1.9888	5.7886	2.4147	0.0268
1999	3.9675	4.2270	2.1600	6.4147	2.6400	0.0350
2000	4.3464	4.0110	2.0505	6.5760	2.5742	0.0403
2001	4.0939	3.6685	1.8777	5.9026	2.4321	0.0338
2002	4.0795	3.8557	—	6.1292	2.6280	0.0326
2003	3.8889	4.3978	—	6.3536	2.8912	0.0336
2004	3.6540	4.5340	—	6.6796	2.9333	0.0337
2005	3.2348	4.0254	—	5.8807	2.5985	0.0294
2006	3.1025	3.8951	—	5.7121	2.4773	0.0267
2007	2.7667	3.7829	—	5.5368	2.3050	0.0235
2008	2.4092	3.5166	—	4.4168	2.2169	0.0235
2009	3.1162	4.3273	—	4.8563	2.8665	0.0333
2010	3.0157	3.9946	—	4.6587	2.8983	0.0345
2011	2.9634	4.1198	—	4.7463	3.3474	0.0373
2012	3.2570	4.1850	—	5.1597	3.4721	0.0409
2013	3.1608	4.1975	—	4.9437	3.4100	0.0324
2014	3.1551	4.1852	—	5.1934	3.4460	0.0298
2015	3.7701	4.1839	—	5.7637	3.9200	0.0312
2016	3.9431	4.3625	—	5.3431	4.0021	0.0363
2017	3.7777	4.2576	—	4.8601	3.8349	0.0337
2018	3.6134	4.2623	—	4.8170	3.6918	0.0327
2019	3.8395	4.2980	—	4.8995	3.8634	0.0352
2020	3.8993	4.4448	—	5.0003	4.1532	0.0365
2021	3.8629	4.5674	—	5.3117	4.2252	0.0352
2022	4.4607	4.6869	—	5.4986	4.6693	0.0340
2023	4.2021	4.5430	—	5.2216	4.6760	0.0300
2024	3.9812	4.3064	—	5.0869	4.5226	0.0263
2025	3.7592	4.2410	—	4.9509	4.5269	0.0251

Current PLN exchange rates
From Google Finance:	AUD CAD CHF CNY EUR GBP HKD JPY USD CZK HUF SEK
From Yahoo! Finance:	AUD CAD CHF CNY EUR GBP HKD JPY USD CZK HUF SEK
From XE.com:	AUD CAD CHF CNY EUR GBP HKD JPY USD CZK HUF SEK
From OANDA:	AUD CAD CHF CNY EUR GBP HKD JPY USD CZK HUF SEK

== List of coins/banknotes ==
Coins of Poland after the monetary reform of 1526–1528 and up to 1795

Name	Value (in groszy)	Introduced by	Minted in	Material	Weight (in grams)	Photos or graphics	Notes
denar	1/18–1/10 grosza	Mieszko I or Boleslaus I the Brave	10th century – 1653	After 1527: copper	0.33 g (Sigismund III Vasa's coin); 0.53 g (John II Casimir)	Gdańsk Denar, 1573	Smallest coin in use
ternar	1/6 grosza	Władysław II Jagiełło	14th century – 1407 (1414); 1526–1529; 1545–1548; 1623	1526 coins: silver (18%) alloy; 1623 coins: silver (7.8%) alloy;	0.57 g		
szeląg	1/3 grosza	Stefan Batory	1579–1627; 1659–1666; 1749–1792	Silver alloy (15.929%); copper from 1658	1.13 g (Stefan Batory szeląg); 1.3 g (boratynka) 0.62 g (local coins, such as the Gdańsk grosz)	Sigismund III Vasa szeląg	The John Casimir szeląg is also called boratynka
półgrosz	1/2 grosza	Władysław II Jagiełło	1398 – early 17th century; 1766–1795	In 1393–1414 (in Lwów): silver alloy (up to 56.2%); then 43.7%. In Kraków: either heavier with 50% silver or lighter with 37.5% silver. From 1766 copper.	Kraków: 1.58 g (50% silver) or 0.96 g (37.5% silver); Stanislaus II Augustus: 1.95 g	Półgrosz obverse, 1548 Półgrosz reverse, 1548	
grosz srebrny	1 grosz srebrny = 7 1/2 groszy miednych	Stanislaus Augustus	1764–1795	36.7% silver alloy	1.99 g	?	
grosz (grosz miedziany from Stanislaus II Augustus' reign)	1 grosz	Casimir III the Great	1367–1849; 1918–present	Casimir III Great: brass coins; later copper	1.3 (Kurland grosz) or 3.4 grams ("Kingdom" grosz); 3.89 g (Stanislaus II Augustus)	Grosz, 1536 Grosz of Sigismund III Vasa, 1626 Latin: "GROSI CRACOVIENSESS" ("Kraków grosz"); Casimir III the Great Latin: "DEI GRATIA REX POLONIE", "KAZIMIRUS PRIMUS" ("By the grace of God, King of Poland", "Casimir I")	The base of the currency
półtorak	1 1/2 grosza	Sigismund III Vasa	1614-1660; in the John II Casimir Vasa and Augustus III reigns	Silver (46.9%) alloy	1.09 g (Augustus III)	Półtorak. Different designs of 17th century	Created as an intermediate between grosz and trojak
dwojak	2 grosze	Sigismund II Augustus	Around the 1520s; sporadically later; more minted at John II Casimir Vasa's reign; 1766–1784; 1923–1939; 1954–	Sigismund I the Old: silver Sigismund II Augustus: silver Stanislaus II: 58.7% silver alloy	1.8 g (Sigismund I the Old) ca. 3.5 g (Sigismund II Augustus); 3.4 g (Stanislaus II Augustus)		
trojak	3 grosze	Sigismund I the Old	1528–1849	Silver, most copper from Stanislaus II Augustus' reign; some Gdańsk coins are copper	2.16 g ("Kingdom" trojak) 1.53 g (Gdańsk trojak); 11.69 g (Stanislaus Augustus) 1.52 g (silver Gdańsk and Toruń trojak)	Trojak of Stefan Batory, 1580	Also called "dutka", "babka", "dydek" in Lithuania
czworak	4 grosze	Sigismund II Augustus	1565–1568; 1614; 1766–1795	Silver; 55% silver alloy (Stanislaus II Augustus)	4.29 g; 5.51 g (Stanislaus II Augustus)		
szóstak	6 groszy	Sigismund I the Old	1528–1795	Silver	2.34 g (Toruń szóstak) 2.94 g (Gdańsk and Elbląg szóstak); 3.7 g (Kurland szóstak) 4.32 g ("Kingdom" szóstak); in 1794–1795 1.52 g	Szóstak	
2 złote [Stanislaus II and Augustus III]	8 groszy	Augustus III	1753-1795	62.67% silver alloy	9.35 g (Stanislaus II) 7.31 g (Augustus III)		
półurcie	9 groszy	?	?	?	?		
10 copper Kingdom groszy	10 groszy	Stanislaus II Augustus	1787-95	37.3% silver alloy	2.49 g, then 4.48 g		
ort	18 groszy	Sigismund III Vasa	1608–1766	Silver	Augustus III reign: 5.84 g ("Kingdom") 6.1 g or 7.7 g (Gdańsk)	Obverse, Sigismund III Vasa; Gdańsk mint, 1618 Reverse with the Gdańsk coat of arms, 1618	Coins of 1618 were minted by Stanisław Berman
półkopek	30 groszy; Stanislaus II Augustus' złoty - 4 grosze	Sigismund II Augustus	1564–1841	Silver alloy (49.955%)	6.726 g (John III Sobieski) 5.84 g ("Kingdom") or 6.1 g (Gdańsk) tymf; złotówka gdańska: 9.85 g	Złoty of 1663	From 1663 on also called tymf
kopa	60 groszy = 2 złote	?	?	Silver	?		
półtalar	15–120 groszy (de facto 15–290, more expensive as time passed)	Sigismund II Augustus	1567–1794	Silver	ca. 12.5 g; 14.62 g (Augustus III reign); 14.03 g, later 13.07 g (Stanislaus II Augustus)	Półtalar of Gdańsk, 1577	
2/3 of talar	only commemorative	Augustus III	1738; 1747	Silver			
talar	30–240 groszy (de facto 30–580, more expensive as time passed)	Sigismund I the Old	1533; 1580–1795	Silver; 83.3% silver alloy (from 1766)	ca. 24.3–29.3 g	Stefan Batory talar, 1578	
2 talars	480 groszy (de facto 1160 groszy)	Augustus III	1740	Silver	58 g		
dukat (florin)	45–1,080 groszy	Ladislaus the Short	Early 14th century–1831	Gold; 98.6% gold alloy (1766–95)	3.46-3.5 g in the second half of the 18th century	The first red złoty of Władysław I the Elbow-high was issued in the 1320s. 40 ducats of Sigismund III Vasa; Latin: "Poloniæ et Suegiæ rex" (The King of Poland and Sweden) The last red złoty, the "insurgent ducat" of 1831	
2 ducats		Augustus III	1753-4	Gold	7 g		
6 ducats		Augustus III	1742	Gold	21 g		
portugał	10 ducats	Sigismund II Augustus	1562–1652	Gold	35 g (Augustus III)	Riga portugał of Stefan Batory 15 ducats, Sigismund III Vasa (Portugał), 1617	
12 ducats		Augustus III	1740	Gold	29.17 g		
półaugustdor	2 1/2 talars = 600 groszy (de jure); 1,450 groszy (de facto)	Augustus III of Poland	1752–1756	Gold	3.32 g		
augustdor	5 talars = 1,200 groszy (de jure); 2,900 groszy (de facto)	Augustus III of Poland	1752–1756	Gold	3.32 g		
double augustdor	10 talars = 2400 talars (de jure); 5800 groszy (de facto)	Augustus III of Poland	1752–1756	Gold	13.3 g		
semi-stanislasdor (półstanislasdor)	27 złotych	Stanislaus II Augustus	1794–1795	Gold	6.17 g		
stanislasdor	54 złotych	Stanislaus II Augustus	1794–1795	Gold (83%)	12.35 g		

Polish Banknotes, series 1919

Picture	Denomination	Size	Colour	Obverse	Reverse	Watermark	Date of print	Date of withdrawal
	1 złoty	93×63	Yellow	Tadeusz Kościuszko, denomination in words, date of print	Coat of arms, denomination in number	—	28 February 1919	31 January 1940
	2 złote	115×80	Blue	Tadeusz Kościuszko, denomination in words, date of print	Denomination in number	—	28 February 1919	31 January 1940
	5 złotych	125×80	Bright yellow, orange	Józef Poniatowski, denomination in words, date of print	Denomination in words, coat of arms	—	28 February 1919 15 July 1924	31 January 1940
	10 złotych	150×88	Yellow	Tadeusz Kościuszko, denomination in words, date of print	Some agricultural products	As portrait	28 February 1919 (not released in public)	31 January 1940
	10 złotych	150×88	Pink	Tadeusz Kościuszko, denomination in words, date of print	Some agricultural products	As portrait	28 February 1919, 15 July 1924	31 January 1940
	20 złotych	160×97	White, red around the coat of arms and watermark	Tadeusz Kościuszko, denomination in words, date of print	Denomination in numbers, coat of arms	As portrait	28 February 1919, 15 July 1924	31 January 1940
	50 złotych	165×102	Brown, yellow around denomination in words	Tadeusz Kościuszko, denomination in words, date of print	Denomination in numbers, coat of arms	As portrait	28 February 1919	31 January 1940
	100 złotych	172×103	Blue	Tadeusz Kościuszko, denomination in words, date of print	Denomination in numbers, coat of arms	As portrait	28 February 1919	31 January 1940
	500 złotych	180×110	Violet and olive	Tadeusz Kościuszko, denomination in words, date of print	Denomination in numbers, coat of arms	As portrait	28 February 1919	31 January 1940
	1000 złotych	183×111	Brown	Tadeusz Kościuszko, denomination in words, date of print	Denomination in numbers, coat of arms	As portrait	28 February 1919 (extremely rare, not released in public)	31 January 1940
	5000 złotych	190×113	Different shades of green	Tadeusz Kościuszko, denomination in words, date of print	Denomination in numbers, coat of arms	As portrait	28 February 1919 (not released in public)	31 January 1940
These images are to scale at 0.7 pixel per millimetre (18 pixel per inch). For table standards, see the banknote specification table.

Coins of the Second Polish Republic

Pictures	Denomination	Diameter(mm)	Thickness(mm)	Mass(g)	Composition	Obverse	Reverse	Introduced	Issued	Withdrawn
	1 grosz	14.7	1.01	1.5	bronze	Polish coat of arms' eagle, inscription: "Rzeczpospolita Polska" and the year of minting	denomination with a simple plant ornament	1923	1923; 1925 1927 1928 1930-1939	1939
	2 grosze	17.6	0.96	2	brass	Polish coat of arms' eagle, inscription: "Rzeczpospolita Polska" and the year of minting	denomination with a simple plant ornament	1923	1923	1939
	2 grosze	17.6	0.98	2	bronze	Polish coat of arms' eagle, inscription: "Rzeczpospolita Polska" and the year of minting	denomination with a simple plant ornament	1923	1925 1927 1928 1930-1939	1939
	5 groszy	20	1.12	3	brass	Polish coat of arms' eagle, inscription: "Rzeczpospolita Polska" and the year of minting	denomination with a simple plant ornament	1923	1923	1939
	5 groszy	20	1.14	3	bronze	Polish coat of arms' eagle, inscription: "Rzeczpospolita Polska" and the year of minting	denomination with a simple plant ornament	1923	1925 1928 1930 1931 1934-1939	1939
	10 groszy	17.6	0.92	2	nickel	Polish coat of arms' eagle, inscription: "Rzeczpospolita Polska" and the year of minting	denomination with a complicated bush ornament	1923	1923	1939
	20 groszy	20	1.07	3	nickel	Polish coat of arms' eagle, inscription: "Rzeczpospolita Polska" and the year of minting	denomination with a complicated bush ornament	1923	1923	1939
	50 groszy	23	1.35	5	nickel	Polish coat of arms' eagle, inscription: "Rzeczpospolita Polska" and the year of minting	denomination with a complicated bush ornament	1923	1923	1939
	1 złoty	25	1.6	7	nickel	Polish coat of arms' eagle, inscription: "Rzeczpospolita Polska" and the year of minting	denomination with an ornament	1929	1929	1939

Banknotes of the Second Polish Republic, series 1925-1939

Pictures	Denomination	Dimension(mm)	Colour	Obverse	Reverse	Watermark	Date of introduction	Date of printing	Date of withdrawal	Author
	1 złoty	108×60	brown	Bolesław I the Brave, denomination, the "Bank of Poland" and "Government note" inscriptions, date and place of issue	Denomination	As portrait	1 October 1938		20 May 1940	Leonard Sowiński
	2 złote	102×63	Gray-yellow	Denomination, portrait of a Doubravka of Bohemia, the "Bank of Poland" inscription, date and place of issue	Denomination, Polish coat of arms	Value(2 zł)	26 February 1936		20 May 1940	Zdzisław Eichler
	5 złotych	127×83	Olive, yellow edges	Portrait of a man, denomination, place and date of issue	A miner in the tunnel, denomination	-	1 May 1925	1 May 1925, 25 October 1926	20 May 1940	Wacław Borowski
	5 złotych	144×78	Blue	Denomination, portrait of a woman, the "Bank of Poland" inscription, date and place of issue	Denomination, coat of arms, "Bank of Poland" inscription	Sigismund I the Old	2 January 1930	2 January 1930 or 26 February 1936	20 May 1940	Ryszard Kleczewski
	10 złotych	160×80	Light brown	Denomination, pictures of saints, coat of arms, the "Bank of Poland" inscription, date and place of issue	A woman with a model ship in her hands, a worker and a female peasant with a bunch of wheat	Bolesław I the Brave, 10 ZŁ	20 July 1926	20 July 1926, 20 July 1929	20 May 1940	Zdzisław Eichler
	10 złotych	158×80	Green	Denomination, a picture of a woman, the "Bank of Poland" inscription, date and place of issue	A road in the field that passes between the trees	As portrait	Never introduced	2 January 1928	20 May 1940	?
	20 złotych	170×94	Obverse: brown, turquoise edges of picture; reverse: violet	A female peasant with a bunch of wheat and a male with a spade, denomination, "Bank of Poland" inscription, date and place of issue	Bank of Poland buildings: the one at the left is the former bank building on the Plac Bankowy; the newer one on the Bielańska street.	Casimir III the Great, 20 ZŁ	1 March 1926	1 March 1926, 20 June 1931	20 May 1940	Zygmunt Kamiński
	20 złotych	163×86	Violet	Portrait of a young girl, denomination, coat of arms, the "Bank of Poland" inscription, date and place of issue	Morskie Oko lake	As portrait	Never introduced	2 January 1928	20 May 1940	?
	20 złotych	170×94	Obverse: brown, light blue edges of picture; reverse: blue	Fortuna with a bunch of wheat and Hermes with a spade, denomination, "Bank of Poland" inscription, date and place of issue	Bank of Poland buildings: the one at the left is the former bank building on the Plac Bankowy; the newer one on the Bielańska street.	Casimir III the Great, 20 ZŁ	1 September 1929		20 May 1940	Zygmunt Kamiński
	20 złotych	163×86	Blue obverse, light green reverse	Portrait of Emilia Plater, denomination, the "Bank of Poland" inscription, date and place of issue	A female peasant with a bunch of wheat and two boys, one of which holding a ship, other a hammer, coat of arms and denomination	Casimir III the Great, 20 ZŁ	20 June 1931		20 May 1940	Ryszard Kleczewski
	20 złotych	163×86	Grey and blue	Emilia Plater, a woman with two daughters on the left with flowers, coat of arms, the "Bank of Poland" inscription, date and place of issue	Wawel Castle, Kraków, a figure of an architect and a poet (symbolize knowledge)	As portrait and denomination	11 November 1936		20 May 1940	Wacław Borowski
	50 złotych	188×99	green, blue and brown	Fortuna with a bunch of wheat and Hermes with a rod of Asclepius, denomination, "Bank of Poland" inscription, date and place of issue	Bank of Poland buildings: the one at the left is the former bank building on the Plac Bankowy; the newer one on the Bielańska street.	Stefan Batory, 50 złotych	28 August 1925	28 August 1925, 1 September 1929,	20 May 1940	Zygmunt Kamiński
	50 złotych	169×92	green	Jan Henryk Dąbrowski portrait, coat of arms, the "Bank of Poland" inscription, date and place of issue	A peasant with a bunch of wheat, two women holding a ship, a boy with an airplane and a worker with a hammer	As portrait and denomination	Never introduced	11 November 1936	20 May 1940	Wacław Borowski
	100 złotych	175×98	Brown	Józef Poniatowski's portrait, denomination, the "Bank of Poland" inscription, date and place of issue	A picture of an oak representing the history of Poland	Queen Jadwiga, 100 ZŁ	2 June 1932	2 June 1932, 9 November 1934	20 May 1940	Józef Mehoffer
These images are to scale at 0.7 pixel per millimetre (18 pixel per inch). For table standards, see the banknote specification table.

Banknotes of the Polish government-in-exile, printed in 1939. Never introduced

Pictures	Denomination	Size (mm)	Colour	Obverse	Reverse	Watermark	Date of print	Designer
	1 złoty	72×45	Bright red	Denomination, the "Bank of Poland" inscription, date and place of issue	Denomination	None	15 August 1939	Włodzimierz Vacek
	2 złote	82×51	Bright green	Denomination, the "Bank of Poland" inscription, date and place of issue	Denomination, ornament	None	15 August 1939	Włodzimierz Vacek
	5 złotych	97×60	Blue to cyan	Denomination, portrait of a woman in the traditional costume, the "Bank of Poland" inscription, date and place of issue	Denomination	None	15 August 1939	Włodzimierz Vacek
	10 złotych	141×67	Red	Denomination, a picture of a woman with a necklace, the "Bank of Poland" inscription, date and place of issue	Płock Cathedral	As portrait	15 August 1939	Edouard Meronti
	20 złotych	153×75	Grey to blue	Denomination, a picture of a female Silesian with a cross, the "Bank of Poland" inscription, date and place of issue	A power plant, behind the typically rural landscape, with haystacks	As portrait	15 August 1939	Edmund Dulac
	20 złotych	153×75	Obverse: different shades of blue, reverse: grey	Denomination, a picture of a girl in the traditional costume, the "Bank of Poland" inscription, date and place of issue	Saintmost Trinity Church in Leszczyny (now in Palowice)	-	20 August 1939	?
	50 złotych	163×80	cyan	A mountain peasant (góral), mountain flowers motive, denomination,	Morskie Oko lake, coat of arms	As portrait and denomination	15 August 1939	Clément Serveau
	50 złotych	163×80	cyan	A female peasant with a sickle and a bunch of cereals	Dunajec River Gorge	-	20 August 1939	?
	100 złotych	171×86	Brown	A portrait of a Mazury peasant, denomination, the "Bank of Poland" inscription, date and place of issue	Landscape nearby the Tyniec, near Kraków	Portrait of a female on 50 zł (20 August 1939)	15 August 1939	Clément Serveau
	500 złotych	182×89	Grey	A portrait of a fisherman with a pipe, denomination, the "Bank of Poland" inscription, date and place of issue	Port in Gdynia	Portrait of a female on 50 zł (20 August 1939)	15 August 1939	Edouard Meronti
These images are to scale at 0.7 pixel per millimetre (18 pixel per inch). For table standards, see the banknote specification table.

Banknotes of Poland, issue 1944–1945 (Series I, also known as "Lublin series")

Obverse	Reverse	Denomination	Size(mm)	Colour	Obverse	Reverse	Date of issue	Date of release	Amount printed	Date of withdrawal
		50 groszy	81×52	Bright pink	Denomination "The National Bank of Poland" inscription, date, coat of arms	Denomination	1944	28 February 1945	6,706,000 (3,503,000 zł)	8 November 1950
		1 złoty	136×66	Green	Denomination "The National Bank of Poland" inscription, date, coat of arms	Denomination, "The National Bank of Poland" inscription	1944	18 September 1944	47,726,000 (47,726,000 zł)	8 November 1950
		2 złote	137×67	Red	Denomination "The National Bank of Poland" inscription, date, coat of arms	Denomination, "The National Bank of Poland" inscription	1944	18 September 1944	18,725,000 (37,450,000 zł)	8 November 1950
		5 złotych	142×71	Brown	Denomination "The National Bank of Poland" inscription, date, coat of arms	Denomination, "The National Bank of Poland" inscription	1944	18 September 1944	81,183,000 (405,915,000 zł)	8 November 1950
		10 złotych	160×80	Blue	Denomination "The National Bank of Poland" inscription, date, coat of arms	Denomination, "The National Bank of Poland" inscription	1944	27 August 1944	22,005,000 (220,050,000 zł)	8 November 1950
		20 złotych	170×83	Teal	Denomination "The National Bank of Poland" inscription, date, coat of arms	Denomination, "The National Bank of Poland" inscription	1944	27 August 1944	114,687,000 (2,293,740,000 zł)	8 November 1950
		50 złotych	180×93	Blue-violet	Denomination "The National Bank of Poland" inscription, date, coat of arms	Denomination, "The National Bank of Poland" inscription	1944	27 August 1944	26,342,000 (1,317,100,000 zł)	8 November 1950
		100 złotych	188×100	Pink	Denomination "The National Bank of Poland" inscription, date, coat of arms	Denomination, "The National Bank of Poland" inscription	1944	27 August 1944	71,237,000 (7,123,700,000 zł)	8 November 1950
		500 złotych	193×102	Olive	Denomination "The National Bank of Poland" inscription, date, coat of arms	Denomination, "The National Bank of Poland" inscription	1944	27 August 1944	19,787,000 (9,893,500,000 zł)	17 December 1946
		1000 złotych (by Ryszard Kleczewski)	182×97	Brown	Denomination "The National Bank of Poland" inscription, date, coat of arms	Denomination, "The National Bank of Poland" inscription	1945	1 September 1945	ca. 19,000,000 (19,000,000,000 zł)	8 November 1950
These images are to scale at 0.7 pixel per millimetre (18 pixel per inch). For table standards, see the banknote specification table.

Banknotes of Poland, issue 1946 (Series II)

Pictures	Denomination	Size(mm)	Colour	Obverse	Reverse	Date of print	Date of release	Date of withdrawal
	1 złoty	98×54	Red	Denomination, "The National Bank of Poland" inscription, date	Denomination	15 May 1946	2 December 1946	8 November 1950
	2 złote	104×57	Green	Denomination, "The National Bank of Poland" inscription, date	Denomination	15 May 1946	15 March 1947	8 November 1950
	5 złotych	122×66	Grey-blue	Denomination, "The National Bank of Poland" inscription, date	Denomination	15 May 1946	5 February 1948	8 November 1950
	10 złotych	128×70	Brown, red	Denomination, "The National Bank of Poland" inscription, date, coat of arms	Denomination, "The National Bank of Poland" inscription	15 May 1946	18 August 1947	8 November 1950
	20 złotych	158×84	Blue to red	Denomination, "The National Bank of Poland" inscription, date, coat of arms	Two planes; denomination	15 May 1946	1 July 1948	8 November 1950
	50 złotych	164×87	Brown, violet	Denomination, "The National Bank of Poland" inscription, date, coat of arms; a steam boat and a sail boat	Boats on the sea, anchors; denomination	15 May 1946	22 September 1947	8 November 1950
	100 złotych	170×91	Red, brown	Denomination, "The National Bank of Poland" inscription, date, coat of arms; a female peasant with a bunch of cereals, a male peasant with a bunch of wheat and a sickle	A peasant on a tractor in the field	15 May 1946	2 December 1946	8 November 1950
	500 złotych	176×94	Green to blue	Denomination, "The National Bank of Poland" inscription, date, coat of arms; a sailor with an anchor and a model of ship; a fisherman	The Old City in Gdańsk	15 January 1946	15 July 1946	8 November 1950
	1000 złotych	182×97	Brown	Denomination, "The National Bank of Poland" inscription, date, coat of arms; miners	Łódź factories panorama	15 January 1946	?	8 November 1950
These images are to scale at 0.7 pixel per millimetre (18 pixel per inch). For table standards, see the banknote specification table.

Banknotes of Poland, issue 1947 (Series III)

Pictures	Denomination	Size(mm)	Colour	Obverse	Reverse	Date of print	Date of release	Date of withdrawal
	20 złotych	158×84	Dark green	Denomination, "The National Bank of Poland" inscription, date, coat of arms	A globe, a book, a machinery detail, a hammer and ralis, symbolising education and industrial work	15 July 1947	16 June 1949	8 November 1950
	100 złotych	170×91	Brown-red	Denomination, "The National Bank of Poland" inscription, date, coat of arms; a female peasant	Horses in a field	15 July 1947	21 February 1949	8 November 1950
	500 złotych	176×94	Blue	Denomination, "The National Bank of Poland" inscription, date, coat of arms; a female sailor with an anchor	Gdynia port	1 July 1947	20 January 1949	8 November 1950
	1000 złotych	182×97	Olive, brown	Denomination, "The National Bank of Poland" inscription, date, coat of arms; a miner with a hammer	A picture of a factory	1 July 1947	1 December 1948	8 November 1950
These images are to scale at 0.7 pixel per millimetre (18 pixel per inch). For table standards, see the banknote specification table.

Banknotes of Poland, issue 1948 (Series IV)

Pictures	Denomination	Size(mm)	Colour	Obverse	Reverse	Date of print	Date of release	Date of withdrawal
	2 złote	120×58	Pale green	Denomination, "The National Bank of Poland" inscription, date, coat of arms (without the crown)	Buildings	1 July 1948	30 October 1950	30 September 1960
	5 złotych	142×67	Brown	Denomination, "The National Bank of Poland" inscription, date, coat of arms (without the crown)	A peasant on a tractor in a field	1 July 1948	30 October 1950	31 December 1959
	10 złotych	148×70	Olive-brown	Denomination, "The National Bank of Poland" inscription, date, coat of arms (without the crown); portrait of a peasant	Peasants at harvesting cereals	1 July 1948	30 October 1950	31 December 1965
	20 złotych	160×76	Blue	Denomination, "The National Bank of Poland" inscription, date, coat of arms (without the crown); portrait of a woman	Cloth Hall, Kraków	1 July 1948	30 October 1950	30 June 1977
	50 złotych	164×78	Green to olive	Denomination, "The National Bank of Poland" inscription, date, coat of arms (without the crown); portrait of a fisherman	Gdynia port	1 July 1948	30 October 1950	30 June 1978
	100 złotych	172×82	Red	Denomination, "The National Bank of Poland" inscription, date, coat of arms (without the crown); portrait of a miner	A picture of a factory	1 July 1948	30 October 1950	30 June 1977
	500 złotych	178×85	Black-brown	Denomination, "The National Bank of Poland" inscription, date, coat of arms (without the crown); portrait of a miner	A picture of coal mining	1 July 1948	30 October 1950	31 December 1977
	1000 złotych	150×74	Bright yellow, red, brown and grey	Denomination, "The National Bank of Poland" inscription, date, coat of arms (without the crown); Mikołaj Kopernik	Nicolaus Copernicus's heliocentric model of the Solar System	29 October 1965	1 June 1966	31 December 1978
These images are to scale at 0.7 pixel per millimetre (18 pixel per inch). For table standards, see the banknote specification table.

Coins of People's Republic of Poland (legal tender 1949-1994, stopped issuing by 1990)

Diameter (⌀) shown in mm, mass in grams. 1 - Minted both in Budapest and Warsaw in numbers of 300,100,600 coins.

Pictures	Denomination	Ø	Mass	Metal	Edge	Obverse	Reverse	Issued in Budapest	Issued in Warsaw	Issued in Basel	Issued in Kremnica	Issued in Leningrad	Introduced	Issued	Withdrawn	With inscription "... Ludowa"?
	1 grosz	14.7	0.5	aluminium	rifled	Coat of arms, year of minting	Denomination, leaf ornament	400,000,000	116,000				1954	1949	1 January 1995	No
	2 grosze^{1}	16	0.57	aluminium	rifled	Coat of arms, year of minting	Denomination, leaf ornament						1954	1949	1 January 1995	No
	5 groszy	20	3	bronze	smooth	Coat of arms, year of minting	Denomination, leaf ornament			300,000,000			1950	1949	1956	No
	5 groszy	20	1	aluminium	rifled	Coat of arms, year of minting	Denomination, leaf ornament				200,000,000		1960	1949	1 January 1995	No
	5 groszy	16	0.6	aluminium	smooth	Coat of arms, year of minting	Denomination, leaf ornament		310,364,378				1958	1958-63; 1965; 1967–1968; 1970–1972	1 January 1995	Yes
	10 groszy	17.6	2	cupronickel	smooth	Coat of arms, year of minting	Denomination, branch ornament				200,000,000		1950	1949	1 January 1995	No
	10 groszy	17.6	0,7	aluminium	smooth	Coat of arms, year of minting	Denomination, branch ornament		31,046,685				1950	1949	1 January 1995	No
	10 groszy	17.6	0,7	aluminium	smooth	Coat of arms, year of minting	Denomination, branch ornament		1,179,713,719		100,000,000		1961	1961-3; 1965–1981; 1983; 1985	1 January 1995	Yes
	20 groszy	20	3	cupronickel	smooth	Coat of arms, year of minting	Denomination, branch ornament				133,383,000		1950	1949	1 January 1995	No
	20 groszy	20	1	aluminium	smooth	Coat of arms, year of minting	Denomination, branch ornament		197,491,750				1950	1949	1 January 1995	No
	20 groszy	20	1	aluminium	smooth	Coat of arms, year of minting	Denomination, branch ornament		879,964,867		50,000,000		1957	1957; 1961–1963; 1965–1973; 1975–1978; 1980–1981; 1983; 1985	1 January 1995	Yes
	50 groszy	23	5	cupronickel	rifled	Coat of arms, year of minting	Denomination, branch ornament				109,000,000		1950	1949	1 January 1995	No
	50 groszy	23	1.6	aluminium	rifled	Coat of arms, year of minting	Denomination, branch ornament		59,392,950				1950	1949	1 January 1995	No
	50 groszy	23	1.6	aluminium	rifled	Coat of arms, year of minting	Denomination, branch ornament		376,793,589		66,800,000		1957	1957; 1965; 1967–1968; 1970–1978; 1982–1985	1 January 1995	Yes
	50 groszy	23	1.6	aluminium	rifled	Coat of arms, year of minting	Denomination, branch ornament		49,052,000				1986	1986-7	1 January 1995	Yes
	1 złoty	25	7	cupronickel	rifled	Coat of arms, year of minting	Denomination, branch ornament				87,053,000		1950	1949	1 January 1995	No
	1 złoty	25	2.12	aluminium	rifled	Coat of arms, year of minting	Denomination, branch ornament		43,000,000				1950	1949	1 January 1995	No
	1 złoty	25	2.12	aluminium	rifled	Coat of arms, year of minting	Denomination, branch ornament		1,110,555,639		60,000,106		1957	1957, 1965–1978, 1980–1988	1 January 1995	Yes
	1 złoty	16	0.57	aluminium	rifled	Coat of arms, year of minting	Denomination, branch ornament						1989	1989-90	1 January 1995	Yes
	2 złote	27	2.7	aluminium	rifled	Coat of arms, year of minting	Denomination, branch and cereal ornament		189,955,432				1958	1958-60; 1970–1974	1 January 1995	Yes
	2 złote	21	3	brass	rifled	Coat of arms, year of minting	Denomination, branch and cereal ornament		633,950,957			137,600,000	1975	1975-1988	1 January 1995	Yes
	2 złote	18	0.7	aluminium	rifled	Coat of arms, year of minting	Denomination, branch and cereal ornament		132,217,000				1989	1989-90	1 January 1995	Yes
	5 złotych	29	3.45	aluminium	rifled	Coat of arms, year of minting	Denomination, fisher		126,439,614				1958	1958-60; 1971; 1973–1974	1 January 1995	Yes
	5 złotych	24	5	brass	rifled	Coat of arms, year of minting	Denomination		315,831,723			135,000,000	1975	1975-88	1 January 1995	Yes
	5 złotych	20	0.88	aluminium	rifled	Coat of arms, year of minting	Denomination		68,501,000				1989	1989-90	1 January 1995	Yes
	10 złotych	31	12.9	cupronickel	rifled	Coat of arms, year of minting	Denomination; Nicolaus Copernicus		15,558,855				1959	1959; 1965	1 January 1995	Yes
	10 złotych	28	9.5	cupronickel	rifled	Coat of arms, year of minting	Denomination; Nicolaus Copernicus		20,129,000				1967	1967-9	1 January 1995	Yes
Analogical to the one lower	10 złotych	31	12.9	cupronickel	rifled	Coat of arms, year of minting	Denomination; Tadeusz Kościuszko		44,808,153				1959	1959-60; 1966	1 January 1995	Yes
	10 złotych	28	9.5	cupronickel	rifled	Coat of arms, year of minting	Denomination; Tadeusz Kościuszko		45,111,000				1969	1969-73	1 January 1995	Yes
	10 złotych	25	7.7	cupronickel	rifled	Coat of arms, year of minting	Denomination, Bolesław Prus		136,314,606				1975	1975-8; 1981-4	1 January 1995	Yes
	10 złotych	25	7.7	cupronickel	rifled	Coat of arms, year of minting	Denomination, Adam Mickiewicz		>55,000,000				1975	1975-7	1 January 1995	Yes
	10 złotych	25	7.7	cupronickel	rifled	Coat of arms, year of minting	Denomination		224,209,255				1984	1984-8	1 January 1995	Yes
	10 złotych	22	4.27	manganese brass	rifled	Coat of arms, year of minting	Denomination		187,692,000				1989	1989-90	1 January 1995	Yes
	20 złotych	29	10.15	cupronickel	rifled	Coat of arms, year of minting	Denomination; a skyscraper and cereals		20,000,000		37,000,000		1973	1973-4; 1976	1 January 1995	Yes
	20 złotych	29	10.15	cupronickel	rifled	Coat of arms, year of minting	Denomination; Marceli Nowotko		56,152,000		30,000,000		1974	1974-7; 1983	1 January 1995	Yes
	20 złotych	26.5	8.7	cupronickel	rifled	Coat of arms, year of minting	Denomination		103,383,710				1984	1984-8	1 January 1995	Yes
	20 złotych	24	5.65	cupronickel	rifled	Coat of arms, year of minting	Denomination		200,686,000				1989	1989-90	1 January 1995	Yes

Banknotes of Poland, issues starting from 1974 (Series V)

Pictures	Denomination	Size(mm)	Colour	Obverse	Reverse	Dates of print	Date of introduction	Date of withdrawal	Date of lapse
	10 złotych	139×63	Blue to green	Denomination, "The National Bank of Poland" inscription, date, coat of arms (without the crown); Józef Bem	Denomination	1 June 1982	11 June 1982	31 December 1994	31 December 2010
	20 złotych	139×63	Mainly red to blue	Denomination, "The National Bank of Poland" inscription, date, coat of arms (without the crown); Romuald Traugutt	Denomination	1 June 1982	11 June 1982	31 December 1994	31 December 2010
	50 złotych	139×63	Green	Denomination, "The National Bank of Poland" inscription, date, coat of arms (without the crown); Karol Świerczewski	Order of the Cross of Grunwald	9 May 1975; 1 June 1979; 1 June 1982; 1 June 1986; 1 December 1988	25 November 1975	31 December 1994	31 December 2010
	100 złotych	139×63	Red	Denomination, "The National Bank of Poland" inscription, date, coat of arms (without the crown); Ludwik Waryński	"Proletaryat"	15 January 1975; 17 May 1976; 1 June 1979; 1 June 1982; 1 June 1986; 1 December 1988	1 July 1975	31 December 1996	31 December 2010
	200 złotych	139×63	Violet	Denomination, "The National Bank of Poland" inscription, date, coat of arms (without the crown); Jarosław Dąbrowski	Communards' Wall; "Za waszą wolność i naszą" (For our liberty and yours).	25 May 1976; 1 June 1979; 1 June 1982; 1 June 1986; 1 December 1988	26 July 1976	31 December 1996	31 December 2010
	500 złotych	139×63	Brown	Denomination, "The National Bank of Poland" inscription, date, coat of arms (without the crown); Tadeusz Kościuszko	The insurrection flag	16 December 1974; 15 June 1976; 1 June 1979; 1 June 1982	1 January 1975	31 December 1996	31 December 2010
	1,000 złotych	139×63	Blue	Denomination, "The National Bank of Poland" inscription, date, coat of arms (without the crown); Mikołaj Kopernik	Nicolaus Copernicus's heliocentric model of the Solar System	2 July 1975; 1 June 1979; 1 June 1982	1 September 1975	31 December 1996	31 December 2010
	2,000 złotych	139×63	Dark brown	Denomination, "The National Bank of Poland" inscription, date, coat of arms (without the crown); Mieszko I	Bolesław I the Brave with a sword	1 May 1977; 1 June 1979; 1 June 1982	27 July 1977	31 December 1996	31 December 2010
	5,000 złotych	139×63	Green	Denomination, "The National Bank of Poland" inscription, date, coat of arms (without the crown); Fryderyk Chopin	Polonaise in notes (author: Fryderyk Chopin)	1 June 1982; 1 June 1986; 1 December 1988	11 June 1982	31 December 1996	31 December 2010
	10,000 złotych	139×63	Green and violet	Denomination, "The National Bank of Poland" inscription, date, coat of arms (without the crown); Stanisław Wyspiański	Kraków (Planty)	1 February 1987; 1 December 1988	4 February 1987	31 December 1996	31 December 2010
	20,000 złotych	139×63	Orange	Denomination, "The National Bank of Poland" inscription, date, coat of arms (without the crown); Marie Curie	Ewa reactor	1 February 1989	26 February 1989	31 December 1996	31 December 2010
	50,000 złotych	139×63	Brown	Denomination, "The National Bank of Poland" inscription, date, coat of arms (without the crown); Stanisław Staszic	Staszic Palace in Warsaw	1 December 1989	11 December 1989	15 October 1994	31 December 2010
	50,000 złotych	139×63	Brown	Denomination, "The National Bank of Poland" inscription, date, coat of arms (without the crown); Stanisław Staszic	Staszic Palace in Warsaw	16 November 1993	11 April 1994	31 December 1996	31 December 2010
	100,000 złotych	139×63	Blue	Denomination, "The National Bank of Poland" inscription, date, coat of arms (with the crown); Stanisław Moniuszko	The Grand Theatre in Warsaw	15 February 1990	26 February 1990	15 October 1994	31 December 2010
	100,000 złotych	139×63	Blue	Denomination, "The National Bank of Poland" inscription, date, coat of arms (with the crown); Stanisław Moniuszko	The Grand Theatre in Warsaw	16 November 1993	11 April 1994	31 December 1996	31 December 2010
	200,000 złotych	139×63	Brown	Denomination, date, coat of arms (without the crown)	Warsaw, coat of arms of Warsaw, the "National Bank of Poland" inscription	1 December 1989	7 December 1989	17 May 1991	31 December 2010
	500,000 złotych	139×63	Cyan and brown	Denomination, "The National Bank of Poland" inscription, date, coat of arms (with the crown); Henryk Sienkiewicz	"The Trilogy", flags	15 April 1990	1 August 1990	15 October 1994	31 December 2010
	500,000 złotych	139×63	Cyan and brown	Denomination, "The National Bank of Poland" inscription, date, coat of arms (with the crown); Henryk Sienkiewicz	"The Trilogy", flags	16 November 1993	24 January 1994	31 December 1996	31 December 2010
	1,000,000 złotych	139×63	Light brown	Denomination, "The National Bank of Poland" inscription, date, coat of arms (with the crown); Władysław Reymont	A rural landscape	15 February 1991	22 April 1991	15 October 1994	31 December 2010
	1,000,000 złotych	139×63	Light brown	Denomination, "The National Bank of Poland" inscription, date, coat of arms (with the crown); Władysław Reymont	A rural landscape	16 November 1993	24 January 1994	31 December 1996	31 December 2010
	2,000,000 złotych	139×63	Multi-coloured	Denomination, "The National Bank of Poland" inscription, date, coat of arms (with the crown); Ignacy Jan Paderewski	Coat of arms as of 1919	14 August 1992	10 November 1992	15 October 1994	31 December 2010
	2,000,000 złotych	139×63	Multi-coloured	Denomination, "The National Bank of Poland" inscription, date, coat of arms (with the crown); Ignacy Jan Paderewski	Coat of arms as of 1919	16 November 1993	11 April 1994	31 December 1996	31 December 2010
	5,000,000 złotych	139×63	Gray and yellow	Denomination, "The National Bank of Poland" inscription, date, coat of arms (with the crown); Józef Piłsudski	Józef Piłsudski's orders	12 May 1995	24 April 2006 (only as collection banknote)	Never withdrawn	Never lapsed
These images are to scale at 0.7 pixel per millimetre (18 pixel per inch). For table standards, see the banknote specification table.

Banknotes of Poland, issue 1990, not in circulation (Cities and sights of Poland)

Obverse	Reverse	Denomination	Size(mm)	Colour	Obverse	Reverse	Date of print
		1 złoty	138×63	blue	Gdynia Shipyard	"Dar Pomorza" yacht	1 March 1990
		2 złote	138×63	dark red to brown	A mining tower in Katowice	The Silesian Uprising monument, by Gustaw Zemła	1 March 1990
		5 złotych	138×63	dark green	City hall in Zamość	The Grunwald Cross Medal	1 March 1990
		10 złotych	138×63	dark red	Royal Castle in Warsaw	Mermaid of Warsaw	1 March 1990
		20 złotych	138×63	yellow	Żuraw Gate in Gdańsk (seen from the Motława)	Neptune's statue on the Neptune's fountain	1 March 1990
		50 złotych	138×63	violet	Town hall in Wrocław	Picture of the 16th-century seal of the city magistrate in Wrocław	1 March 1990
		100 złotych	138×63	orange	Town hall in Poznań	Picture of the old seal of the city magistrate in Poznań	1 March 1990
		200 złotych	138×63	light blue	Wawel Castle	Picture of the Piast dynasty seal	1 March 1990
		500 złotych	138×63	teal	Gniezno Cathedral	Picture of the seal of Gniezno in Piast dynasty times	1 March 1990
		1,000 złotych	138×63	multicoloured - mainly yellow	Kalisz	Picture of the seal of Kalisz city authorities	1 March 1990
		2,000 złotych	138×63	brown	Biskupin archaeological site - fortress	Dishes from the site	1 March 1990
These images are to scale at 0.7 pixel per millimetre (18 pixel per inch). For table standards, see the banknote specification table.

Banknotes of Poland, issue 1994, "Sovereigns of Poland" (first version)

Obverse picture	Reverse picture	Value	Dimensions	Colour	Watermark	Obverse	Reverse	Symbol	printing	issue	annul
		10 zł	120 × 60 mm	Green and brown	As portrait	Mieszko I	Silver denar coin during the reign of Mieszko I	Square	25 March 1994	1 January 1995	current
		20 zł	126 × 63 mm	Pink, violet and blue	As portrait	Bolesław I the Brave	Silver denar coin during the reign of Bolesław I the Brave; St. Nicholas Church in Cieszyn	Circle	25 March 1994	1 January 1995	current
		50 zł	132 × 66 mm	Mainly blue	As portrait	Casimir III the Great	White Eagle from the royal seal of Casimir III the Great and the regalia of Poland: sceptre and globus cruciger; Kraków drawing from a medieval book	Rhombus	25 March 1994	1 January 1995	current
		100 zł	138 × 69 mm	Mainly green	As portrait	Władysław II Jagiełło	Shield bearing a White Eagle from the tombstone of Władysław II Jagiełło, coat of the Teutonic Knights and the Grunwald Swords; Malbork castle on the left	Plus	25 March 1994	1 June 1995	current
		200 zł	144 × 72 mm	Mainly yellow	As portrait	Sigismund I the Old	Eagle intertwined with the letter S in a hexagon, from the Sigismund's Chapel in Kraków	Triangle	25 March 1994	1 June 1995	current
These images are to scale at 0.7 pixel per millimetre (18 pixel per inch). For table standards, see the banknote specification table.

Coins of the Republic of Poland

Obverse pictures	Reverse pictures	Denomination	Diameter(mm)	Mass(g)	Composition	Edge	Obverse	Reverse	Issued	Producer
		1 grosz	15.5	1.64	manganese brass	rifled	denomination with a leaf ornament	Polish coat of arms', inscription: "Rzeczpospolita Polska" and the year of minting	1990-3 1995 1997-2005 2007-14	Mennica Warszawska
		1 grosz	15.5	1.64	steel galvanized by brass	rifled	denomination with a leaf ornament	Polish coat of arms', inscription: "Rzeczpospolita Polska" and the year of minting (design different from the one of earlier issues)	2013-6	The Royal Mint
		2 grosze	17.5	2.13	manganese brass	smooth	denomination with a leaf ornament	Polish coat of arms', inscription: "Rzeczpospolita Polska" and the year of minting	1990-2 1997-2005 2007-14	Mennica Warszawska
		2 grosze	17.5	2.13	steel galvanized by brass	smooth	denomination with a leaf ornament	Polish coat of arms', inscription: "Rzeczpospolita Polska" and the year of minting (design different from the one of earlier issues)	2013-6	The Royal Mint
		5 groszy	19.5	2.59	manganese brass	milled: 4 rows, each has 12 dents	denomination with a leaf ornament	Polish coat of arms', inscription: "Rzeczpospolita Polska" and the year of minting	1990-3 1998-2005 2007-14	Mennica Warszawska
		5 groszy	19.5	2.59	steel galvanized by brass	milled: 4 rows, each has 12 dents	denomination with a leaf ornament	Polish coat of arms', inscription: "Rzeczpospolita Polska" and the year of minting (design different from the one of earlier issues)	2013-6	The Royal Mint
		10 groszy	16.5	2.51	cupronickel	milled: 4 rows, each has 10 dents	denomination with a bush ornament	Polish coat of arms', inscription: "Rzeczpospolita Polska" and the year of minting	1990-3 1998-2005 2007-15	Mennica Warszawska
		20 groszy	18.5	3.22	cupronickel	rifled	denomination with a leaf ornament	Polish coat of arms', inscription: "Rzeczpospolita Polska" and the year of minting	1990-2 1996-2016	Mennica Warszawska
		50 groszy	20.5	3.94	cupronickel	rifled	denomination with a leaf ornament	Polish coat of arms', inscription: "Rzeczpospolita Polska" and the year of minting	1990-2 1995 2006 2008-15	Mennica Warszawska
		1 złoty	23	5.00	cupronickel	milled: 2 rows, each has 16 dents	denomination with a leaf ornament, in a circle	Polish coat of arms', inscription: "Rzeczpospolita Polska" and the year of minting	1990-5 2008-10 2012-5	Mennica Warszawska
		2 złote	21.5 the centre diameter: 12	5.21	Centre: cupronickel; Ring: aluminium bronze	smooth	denomination	Polish coat of arms', inscription: "Rzeczpospolita Polska" and the year of minting	1994-5 2005-10 2014-5	Mennica Warszawska
		5 złotych	24 the centre diameter: 16	6.54	Ring: cupronickel; Centre: aluminium bronze	irregularly rifled	denomination	Polish coat of arms', inscription: "Rzeczpospolita Polska" and the year of minting	1994 1996 2008-10 2015	Mennica Warszawska

Issue of Polish coins (Note. Coins from 1990-1994 are valid. They were released on 1 January 1995)

Year\coin	5 zł	2 zł	1 zł	50 gr	20 gr	10 gr	5 gr	2 gr	1 gr	Total amount	Worth
1990			20,240,000	29,152,000	25,100,000	43,055,000	70,240,000	34,400,000	29,140,000	251,327,000	48,632,900 PLN
1991			60,080,000	99,120,000	75,400,000	123,164,300	171,040,000	97,410,000	79,000,000	705,214,300	148,326,630 PLN
1992			102,240,000	116,000,000	106,100,001	210,000,005	103,784,000	157,000,003	362,000,000	1,157,124,009	214,409,200.76 PLN
1993			20,904,000			84,240,008	20,280,101		80,780,000	206,204,109	31,149,805.85 PLN
1994	112,896,033	79,644,000	69,956,000							262,496,033	793,724,165 PLN
1995		122,880,020	99,740,122	101,600,113					102,280,109	426,500,364	377,323,019.59 PLN
1996	52,940,003				29,745,000					82,685,003	270,649,015 PLN
1997					59,755,000			92,400,002	103,080,002	255,235,004	14,829,800.06 PLN
1998					52,500,000	62,695,000	93,472,002	154,840,050	257,640,003	621,147,055	27,116,301.13 PLN
1999					25,985,000	47,040,000	99,024,000	187,900,000	203,970,000	563,919,000	20,649,900 PLN
2000					52,135,000	104,060,000	75,600,000	94,500,000	210,100,000	536,395,000	28,604,000 PLN
2001					41,980,001	62,820,000	67,368,000	84,000,000	210,000,020	466,168,021	21,826,400.40 PLN
2002					10,500,000	10,500,000	67,200,000	83,910,000	240,000,000	412,110,000	10,588,200 PLN
2003					20,400,000	31,500,000	48,000,000	80,000,000	250,000,000	429,900,000	13,730,000 PLN
2004					40,000,025	70,500,000	62,500,000	100,000,000	300,000,000	573,000,025	23,175,005 PLN
2005		5,000,000			37,000,025	94,000,000	113,000,000	163,003,250	375,000,000	787,003,275	39,460,070 PLN
2006		5,000,000		35,000,000	40,000,000					80,000,000	35,500,000 PLN
2007		20,000,000			68,000,000	100,000,000	116,000,000	160,000,000	330,000,000	794,000,000	75,900,000 PLN
2008	5,000,000	15,000,000	5,000,000	13,000,000	91,000,000	103,000,000	107,000,000	172,000,000	316,000,000	827,000,000	106,950,000 PLN
2009	59,000,000	62,000,000	34,000,000	57,000,000	133,000,000	146,000,000	160,000,000	222,000,000	338,000,000	1,211,000,000	538,520,000 PLN
2010	30,000,000	15,000,000	3,000,000	12,000,000	45,000,000	62,000,000	100,000,000	120,000,000	150,000,000	537,000,000	213,100,000 PLN
2011				10,000,000	15,000,000	80,000,000	90,000,000	150,000,000	270,000,000	615,000,000	26,200,200 PLN
2012			10,000,000	12,000,000	38,000,000	136,000,000	60,000,000	100,000,000	365,000,000	721,000,000	45,850,000 PLN
2013			21,000,000	30,000,000	36,000,000	142,000,000	88,000,000	150,000,000	323,000,000	790,000,000	68,030,000 PLN
2014		28,000,000	35,250,000	28,400,000	46,000,000	88,000,000	96,004,500	137,084,750	420,924,900	879,664,150	135,201,169 PLN
2015	38,040,000	34,350,000	39,000,000	44,010,000	78,030,000	112,050,000	115,050,000	129,870,000	388,560,000	978,960,000	358,951,500 PLN
Total	297,876,036	386,874,020	520,410,122	587,282,113	1,166,630,052	1,912,624,313	1,923,562,003	2,670,318,055	5,704,475,034	15,170,052,718	-
Worth	1,489,380,180 zł	773,748,040 zł	520,410,122 zł	293,641,056.50 zł	233,326,010.40 zł	191,262,431.30 zł	96,178,100.15 zł	53,406,361.10 zł	57,044,750.34 zł	-	3,708,396,951.79 zł

Banknotes of Poland, issue 2012-, "Sovereigns of Poland" (second version, modernized)

Obverse picture	Reverse picture	Colour	Value	Dimensions	Watermark	Obverse	Reverse	Symbol	printing	issue	annul
		Green and brown	10 zł	120 × 60 mm	As portrait	Mieszko I	Silver denar coin during the reign of Mieszko I	Square	5 January 2012	7 April 2014	current
		Pink, violet and blue	20 zł	126 × 63 mm	As portrait	Bolesław I the Brave	Silver denar coin during the reign of Bolesław I Chrobry; St. Nicholas Church in Cieszyn	Circle	5 January 2012	7 April 2014	current
		Mainly blue	50 zł	132 × 66 mm	As portrait	Casimir III the Great	White Eagle from the royal seal of Casimir III the Great and the regalia of Poland: sceptre and globus cruciger; Kraków drawing from a medieval book	Rhombus	5 January 2012	7 April 2014	current
		Mainly green	100 zł	138 × 69 mm	As portrait	Władysław II Jagiełło	Shield bearing a White Eagle from the tombstone of Władysław II Jagiełło, coat of the Teutonic Knights and the Grunwald Swords; Malbork castle on the left	Plus	5 January 2012	7 April 2014	current
		Mainly yellow	200 zł	144 × 72 mm	As portrait	Sigismund I the Old	Eagle intertwined with the letter S in a hexagon, from the Sigismund's Chapel on Wawel	Triangle consisting of 12 dots	30 March 2015	12 February 2016	current
		Multicoloured	500 zł	150 × 75 mm	As portrait	John III Sobieski	Wilanow Palace, coat of arms from the reign of John III Sobieski	Two vertical lines of four dots each (when the note is laid horizontally)	16 February 2016	10 February 2017	current
These images are to scale at 0.7 pixel per millimetre (18 pixel per inch). For table standards, see the banknote specification table.

Commemorative banknotes of Poland

Obverse	Reverse	Value	Dimensions (mm)	Main Color	Obverse	Reverse	Watermark	Emission	Issue date
		10 zł	138×69	Pink, orange	Polish coat of arms, Belweder Palace, Commander Józef Piłsudski	White eagle, Monument of the Heroic Deed of Polish Legions in Kielce.	Józef Piłsudski, electrotype denomination	80,000	3 November 2008
		19 zł	150×77	Blue and yellow	Arms, medal, Ignacy Jan Paderewski	Polish Security Printing Works building in Warsaw	Eagle	up to 55,000	2 October 2019
		20 zł	138×69	Orange, yellow, brown	Polish coat of arms, Chalet in Krzemieniec, Juliusz Słowacki	Cranes, an excerpt of the poem Sedation, Statue of Sigismund III Vasa at Castle Square in Warsaw.	Juliusz Słowacki, electrotype denomination	80,000	23 September 2009
		20 zł	138×69	Light blue, Light brown, black	Frédéric Chopin, the mansion in Żelazowa Wola where the composer was born, reproduction of the first edition of Mazurka in B-flat major, Opus 7 No 1, Chopin's autograph.	Facsimile of a fragment of Étude in f-minor, Opus 10, No 9; landscape in Central Poland with Masovian willows.	Chopin	120,000	26 February 2010
		20 zł	138×69	Brown and green	Maria Skłodowska-Curie, Sorbona w Paryżu (Sorbonne school building in Paris), Coat of arms, Ra (atomic symbol for radium) in SPARK patch in concentric circles.	Curie quotation ("I have detected the radium, but not created it; the glory does not belong to me, but it is the property of the whole mankind."), Instytut Radowy w Warszawie (Radium Institute building in Warsaw); Nobel Prize medal for chemistry.	Marie Skłodowska Curie and electrotype denomination	60,000	12 December 2011
		20 zł	147×67	Green, brown, yellow and blue	Belvedere Palace hologram; coat of arms with crowned eagle; Commander Józef Klemens Piłsudski wearing military uniform.	Eagle badge of the Polish Legions; Grand Cross (with Star) of the Order of Virtuti Militari; badge of the First Brigade of the Polish Legions; Belvedere Palace hologram.	None	50,000	5 August 2014
		20 zł	138×69	Brown, green, gold and violet	1415 as registration device; open book; coat of arms with crowned eagle; Jan Długosz	Wieniawa coat of arms; Wawel cathedral in Kraków; stained glass window	Shield with crowned eagle	30,000	24 August 2015
		20 zł	144×77	Blue and red	Coat of arms with crowned eagle; Dobrawa (Doubravka of Bohemia) and King Miezko I; ornate cross; floor plan of church as registration device	Floor plan of church; Gniezno Cathedral; royal chalice of Trzemeszno	Unknown with electrotype 20	35,000	12 April 2016
		20 zł	150×77	Yellow and blue	Diadems, arms	Częstochowa	Filigree with electrotype 20	up to 55,000	21 August 2017
		20 zł	150×77	Teal and yellow	Józef Piłsudski, arms	Arms, flag	Eagle	up to 50,000	31 August 2018
		20 zł	150×77	Yellow, teal and red	Józef Piłsudski, arms	Medal, scene from the Battle of Warsaw	Eagle with electrotype 20	up to 60,000	11 August 2020
		50 zł	144×72	Blue, yellow	Pope John Paul II, Polish coat of arms	Cardinal Stefan Wyszynski, a quotation from Letter to Poles, Jasna Góra Monastery and church	Papal arms of John Paul II	2,000,000	16 October 2006
These images are to scale at 0.7 pixel per millimetre (18 pixel per inch). For table standards, see the banknote specification table.

Commemorative coins of the Republic of Poland

Pictures	Value	Diameter(mm)	Mass(g)	Composition	Edge	Obverse	Reverse(designer's name)	Amount	Year of minting
	2 złote	29.5	10.8	cupronickel	mixed	Coat of arms, year of minting; inscription: "Rzeczpospolita Polska"; denomination	A cemetery with a lot of crosses; Katyń - Miednoje - Charków (places of execution of Polish soldiers); (Roussanka Nowakowska)	300,000	1995
	2 złote	29.5	10.8	cupronickel	mixed	Coat of arms, year of minting; inscription: "Rzeczpospolita Polska"; denomination	Catfish (Roussanka Nowakowska)	300,000	1995
	2 złote	29.5	10.8	cupronickel	mixed	Coat of arms, year of minting; inscription: "Rzeczpospolita Polska"; denomination	75 years of the Battle of Warsaw (1920); (Ewa Tyc-Karpińska)	300,000	1995
	2 złote	29.5	10.8	cupronickel	mixed	Coat of arms, year of minting; inscription: "Rzeczpospolita Polska"; denomination	Łazienki Palace; (Ewa Tyc-Karpińska)	287,300	1995
	2 złote	29.5	10.8	cupronickel	mixed	Coat of arms, year of minting; inscription: "Rzeczpospolita Polska"; denomination	100 years of the modern Olympic Games (Robert Kotowicz)	350,000	1995
	2 złote	29.5	10.8	cupronickel	mixed	Coat of arms, year of minting; inscription: "Rzeczpospolita Polska"; denomination	1996 Summer Olympics - wrestlers (Robert Kotowicz)	350,000	1995
	2 złote	27	8.15	Nordic gold	smooth	Coat of arms, year of minting; inscription: "Rzeczpospolita Polska"; denomination	Sigismund II Augustus (Ewa Tyc-Karpińska)	200,000	1996
	2 złote	27	8.15	Nordic gold	smooth	Coat of arms, year of minting; inscription: "Rzeczpospolita Polska"; denomination	Erinaceus europaeus (Roussanka Nowakowska)	300,000	1996
	2 złote	27	8.15	Nordic gold	smooth	Coat of arms, year of minting; inscription: "Rzeczpospolita Polska"; denomination	Castle in Lidzbark Warmiński (Andrzej Nowakowski)	300,000	1996
	2 złote	27	8.15	Nordic gold	smooth	Coat of arms, year of minting; inscription: "Rzeczpospolita Polska"; denomination	Henryk Sienkiewicz (Robert Kotowicz)	300,000	1996
	2 złote	27	8.15	Nordic gold	smooth	Coat of arms, year of minting; inscription: "Rzeczpospolita Polska"; denomination	Stephen Báthory (Ewa Tyc-Karpińska)	315,000	1997
	2 złote	27	8.15	Nordic gold	smooth	Coat of arms, year of minting; inscription: "Rzeczpospolita Polska"; denomination	Lucanus cervus (Andrzej Nowakowski)	315,000	1997
	2 złote	27	8.15	Nordic gold	smooth	Coat of arms, year of minting; inscription: "Rzeczpospolita Polska"; denomination	Pieskowa Skała castle (Roussanka Nowakowska)	315,000	1997
	2 złote	27	8.15	Nordic gold	smooth	Coat of arms, year of minting; inscription: "Rzeczpospolita Polska"; denomination	200 years from the birth of Paweł Edmund Strzelecki; Australia and its endemite animals (Roussanka Nowakowska)	420,000	1997
	2 złote	27	8.15	Nordic gold	smooth	Coat of arms, year of minting; inscription: "Rzeczpospolita Polska"; denomination	1998 Winter Olympics - snowboarder (Robert Kotowicz)	400,000	1998
	2 złote	27	8.15	Nordic gold	smooth	Coat of arms, year of minting; inscription: "Rzeczpospolita Polska"; denomination	Sigismund III Vasa (Ewa Tyc-Karpińska)	400,000	1998
	2 złote	27	8.15	Nordic gold	smooth	Coat of arms, year of minting; inscription: "Rzeczpospolita Polska"; denomination	Bufo calamita (Ewa Tyc-Karpińska)	400,000	1998
	2 złote	27	8.15	Nordic gold	smooth	Coat of arms, year of minting; inscription: "Rzeczpospolita Polska"; denomination	100 years of polonium and radium discovery; Marie and Pierre Curie (Robert Kotowicz)	400,000	1998
	2 złote	27	8.15	Nordic gold	smooth	Coat of arms, year of minting; inscription: "Rzeczpospolita Polska"; denomination	Kórnik Castle (Ewa Olszewska-Borys)	400,000	1998
	2 złote	27	8.15	Nordic gold	smooth	Coat of arms, year of minting; inscription: "Rzeczpospolita Polska"; denomination	80 years of independence (Ewa Tyc-Karpińska)	400,000	1998
	2 złote	27	8.15	Nordic gold	smooth	Coat of arms, year of minting; inscription: "Rzeczpospolita Polska"; denomination	200 years from the birth of Adam Mickiewicz (Ewa Tyc-Karpińska)	420,000	1998
	2 złote	27	8.15	Nordic gold	smooth	Coat of arms, year of minting; inscription: "Rzeczpospolita Polska"; denomination	100 years of Ernest Malinowski's death, inscription: "The creator of the Ferrocarril Central Andino" (Robert Kotowicz)	420,000	1999
	2 złote	27	8.15	Nordic gold	smooth	Coat of arms, year of minting; inscription: "Rzeczpospolita Polska"; denomination	150 years of Julisz Słowacki's death (Robert Kotowicz)	420,000	1999
	2 złote	27	8.15	Nordic gold	NARODOWY BANK POLSKI ★	Coat of arms, year of minting; inscription: "Rzeczpospolita Polska"; denomination	Wolf (Canis lupus) (Roussanka Nowakowska)	420,000	1999
	2 złote	27	8.15	Nordic gold	NARODOWY BANK POLSKI ★	Coat of arms, year of minting; inscription: "Rzeczpospolita Polska"; denomination	150 years of Fryderyk Chopin's death (Roussanka Nowakowska)	420,000	1999
	2 złote	27	8.15	Nordic gold	NARODOWY BANK POLSKI ★	Coat of arms, year of minting; inscription: "Rzeczpospolita Polska"; denomination	Poland's admission to NATO; soldiers going out of a helicopter; a globe (Ewa Tyc-Karpińska)	450,000	1999
	2 złote	27	8.15	Nordic gold	NARODOWY BANK POLSKI ★	Coat of arms, year of minting; inscription: "Rzeczpospolita Polska"; denomination	Jan Łaski - the Church reformer (Ewa Tyc-Karpińska)	450,000	1999
	2 złote	27	8.15	Nordic gold	NARODOWY BANK POLSKI ★	Coat of arms, year of minting; inscription: "Rzeczpospolita Polska"; denomination	Radzyń Podlaski Castle (Ewa Tyc-Karpińska)	450,000	1999
	2 złote	27	8.15	Nordic gold	NARODOWY BANK POLSKI ★	Coat of arms, year of minting; inscription: "Rzeczpospolita Polska"; denomination	Władysław IV Vasa (Ewa Tyc-Karpińska)	500,000	1999

== See also ==
- Commemorative coins of Poland
- Economy of Poland
- Historical coins and banknotes of Poland
- Poland and the euro
- Polish coins and banknotes
