= 200-złoty note =

Denomination of Polish currency

The Polish 200-złoty note is a denomination of Polish currency. It is also the only Polish bill to feature a hologram (only in the first, non-modernized version). The bill's dimensions are 144 x 72 mm.

The obverse of the note features a likeness of King Sigismund I the Old. The reverse depicts the white eagle wrapped in the letter S, inscribed in a hexagon, from the Sigismund's Chapel at the Wawel Castle.
