= 20-złoty note =

Denomination of Polish currency

Twenty złotych
- Country: Poland
- Value: 20 Polish złoty
- Width: 126 mm
- Height: 63 mm
- Material used: White paper
- Years of printing: 1924 - 1950; 1950 - 1995; 1995 - present

Obverse
- Design: Portrait of King Boleslaus I the Brave in centre area

Reverse
- Design: Depiction of a denar, a silver coin from Boleslaus I the Brave's reign, in centre area

The Polish 20-złoty note is a denomination of the Polish złoty.

== History ==
=== First złoty banknotes ===
In 1794, treasury notes were issued in denominations of 5 and 10 groszy, 1, 4, 5, 10, 25, 50, 100, 500 and 1000 złotych. The Duchy of Warsaw issued notes for 1, 2 and 5 talarów.

In 1824, the Bank Kassowy Królestwa Polskiego issued notes for 10, 50 and 100 złotych. The Bank Polski issued notes dated 1830 and 1831 in denominations of 1, 5, 50 and 100 złotych, whilst assignats for 200 and 500 złotych were issued during the insurrection of 1831. From 1841, the Bank Polski issued notes denominated in roubles.

=== Second złoty banknotes ===
In 1924, along with provisional notes (overprints on old, bisected notes) for 1 and 5 groszy, the Ministry of Finance issued notes for 10, 20 and 50 groszy, whilst the Bank Polski introduced 1, 2, 5, 10, 20, 50, 100, 500 and 1000 złotych. From 1925, the Ministry of Finance issued 2- and 5-złoty notes, before they were replaced by silver coins, and the Bank Polski issued 5-, 10-, 20- and 50-złoty notes, with the 100-złoty note only reintroduced in 1932. In 1936, the Bank Polski issued 2 złote notes, followed in 1938 by Ministry of Finance notes for 1 złoty.

In 1939, the General Government overprinted 100-złoty notes for use before, in 1940, the Bank Emisyjny w Polsce was set up and issued notes for 1, 2, 5, 10, 20, 50, 100 and 500 złotych. After liberation, notes (dated 1944) were introduced by the Narodowy Bank Polski for 50 grosz, 1, 2, 5, 10, 20, 50, 100 and 500 złotych, with 1000-złoty notes added in 1945.

=== Third złoty banknotes ===
In 1950, new notes, which were dated 1948, were introduced for 2, 5, 10, 20, 50, 100 and 500 złotych, but 1000-złoty notes were added in 1962. 200- and 2000-złoty notes were added in 1976 and 1977, followed by 5000-złoty notes in 1982. The late 1980s and early 1990s saw high inflation in Poland and led to the introduction of notes in denominations of 10,000 in 1987, 20,000 in 1989, 50,000 in 1989, 100,000 in 1990, 200,000 in 1989, 500,000 in 1990, 1,000,000 in 1991 and 2,000,000 złotych in 1992. These notes (and coins) were valid, but with the exception of the 200,000-złoty note, until the end of 1996. They could be exchanged at the National Bank of Poland and some banks obligated to it by the NBP until 31 December 2010, and they are no longer legal tender.

=== Current banknotes ===
In 1995, notes, which were dated 1994, were introduced in denominations of 10 złotych, 20 złotych, 50 złotych, 100 złotych, 200 złotych, and 500 złotych. There were plans to introduce a 1,000-złoty bill.

== Collector banknotes ==
The National Bank of Poland has issued three 20-złoty collector's banknotes, the first in 2009, and the third in 2011.

=== The 200th birth anniversary of Juliusz Słowacki ===
The 200th birthday anniversary of Juliusz Słowacki commemorative banknote by the NBP

The 200th birth anniversary of Juliusz Słowacki, a Polish poet and playwright, one of the most eminent authors of the Romanticism in Poland, has been commemorated by the National Bank of Poland by issuance of a collector banknote worth 20 złotych. The banknote was put into circulation on 23 September 2009.

On the obverse of the note, on the right-hand side, Juliusz Słowacki’s bust is placed. The centre has a stylised image of the manor house in Krzemieniec, which, for the past years, has served as the Juliusz Słowacki Museum. The state emblem of the Republic of Poland is placed on this side.

On the reverse of the note, on the left-hand side, there is a fragment of King Sigismund III Vasa Column at the Castle Square in Warsaw. At the top, there are images of flying cranes. In the centre, there is a reproduction of an excerpt from the poem "Uspokojenie" (Reassurance) and, at the bottom, a fragment of St. John the Baptist's Cathedral in Warsaw. The author of the designs is Maciej Kopecki, chief graphic designer at the Polish Security Printing Works (PWPW).

==== Security features ====
The security features of this commemorative banknote are:

- A watermark, which is a portrait of Juliusz Słowacki in profile.
- A security thread and microprinting, with a recurring sign composed of the denomination and its mirror image.
- Intaglio printing on the obverse and the reverse of the banknote which are identifiable by touch.
- Microprinting, consisting of offset and steel engraving. The inscriptions are "JULIUSZSŁOWACKI20ZŁ", "NARODOWYBANKPOLSKI20ZŁ", “NBP" and the titles of Słowacki’s works.
- A serial number printed horizontally on the reverse of the note, at the bottom on the left-hand side and at the top on the right-hand side of the note.
- Optically variable ink on the reverse of the note, at the bottom right-hand corner, the marking of the denomination and at the top on the left-hand side, at the image of the crane, changing colour from golden into green, depending on the angle the banknote is viewed at.
- Opalescent ink on the reverse of the note, at the top, in the middle and in the image of a crane.
- Recto-verso, which consists of fragments of an image of an inkwell and a quill pen printed on both sides of the note, combining perfectly to form a complete image.
- Single latent image, on the obverse of the note, on the right side of the portrait, which is a sign, "2009", printed vertically, visible depending on the angle the note is viewed at.
- Raised image on the obverse of the note, in the top left-hand part, an image of a crane, which is identifiable by touch.
- Ultraviolet ink, on the serial number printed on the reverse of the note, at the bottom on the left-hand side, and images of ten flying cranes in the centre.
- “XX” feature for the visually impaired on the obverse of the note, at the bottom left-hand corner, which is identifiable by touch.

=== 200th anniversary of the birth of Frédéric Chopin ===
The 200th anniversary of the birth of Frédéric Chopin commemorative banknote by the NBP

The National Bank of Poland commemorated the 200th anniversary of the birth of an eminent Polish composer and pianist Frédéric Chopin by issuing a collector note with the face value of 20 złoty. The note was issued at the turn of February and March 2010.

The obverse of the note depicts a portrait of Frédéric Chopin in profile. This element has been produced with the steel engraving technique. The engraving of the portrait was done by Przemysław Krajewski, a hand engraving artist at the Polish Security Printing Works. (PWPW) On the left-hand side, there is an image of the manor house in Żelazowa Wola where the composer was born. On the right-hand side, there is a reproduction of the first edition of Mazurka in B-flat major, Op. 7 No. 1 and of the autograph of the composer.

The reverse of the note shows a facsimile of a fragment of Étude in f-minor, Op. 10, No. 9, against a landscape with willows, characteristic of the Central Poland region. Designed by Grzegorz Pfeifer and Katarzyna Jarnuszkiewicz, and printed by the Polish Security Printing Works, it measures 138 x 69 mm.

==== Security features ====
The security features of the banknote are:

- A watermark showing a portrait of Frédéric Chopin in profile,
- A security thread with microprint that features the face value of the note and its mirror image in a recurring pattern,
- Intaglio printing on the obverse of the note, which is identifiable by touch,
- Offset microprinting on the obverse (”20”, “ZŁ”, “NBP”) and reverse of the note (“NBP20NBP20”, and “NARODOWYBANKPOLSKI20ZŁ”), the latter ones in varying letter height,
- Serial number on the reverse of the note printed vertically along the left edge of the banknote and horizontally on the bottom right-hand side of the banknote,
- Optically variable ink, changing colour from golden into green depending on the angle the note is viewed at, used for the facsimile of Frédéric Chopin’s signature on the obverse of the note and for the stylised image of a music stand and the stylised stave on the reverse,
- Recto-verso print, as fragments of a notation printed on both sides of the note, when held against the light combining perfectly to form a complete image,
- Ultraviolet ink used on the obverse of the note (a fragment of the Mazurka in B-flat major, Op. 7 No. 1 with a notation of the bars 2-3 and 7-8) and for the serial number on the reverse,
- The “XX” feature for the visually impaired located on the front of the note, in the bottom left-hand corner, identifiable by touch.

=== 100th anniversary of the awarding of the Nobel Prize in chemistry to Marie Skłodowska-Curie ===
100th anniversary of the awarding of the Nobel Prize winner Marie Skłodowska-Curie

To celebrate the 100th anniversary of the awarding of the Nobel Prize in chemistry to Marie Skłodowska-Curie the National Bank of Poland has issued a collector banknote of the face value of 20 złotych. The banknote was put into circulation on 25 November 2011.

The obverse of the note features an image of Marie Skłodowska-Curie and the shape of the building of the Sorbonne in Paris.

The reverse of the note depicts an image of the medal awarded to the Nobel Prize winners, a quotation from the speech by Marie Skłodowska-Curie on radium and an image of the seat of the Radium Institute in Warsaw.

The author of the design is Agnieszka Próchniak. The steel engraving matrix was done by Przemysław Krajewski. The dimensions of the banknote are 138x69 mm. It was manufactured by the Polish Security Printing Works (PWPW) and printed in a volume of sixty thousand notes.
