= Stanislasdor =

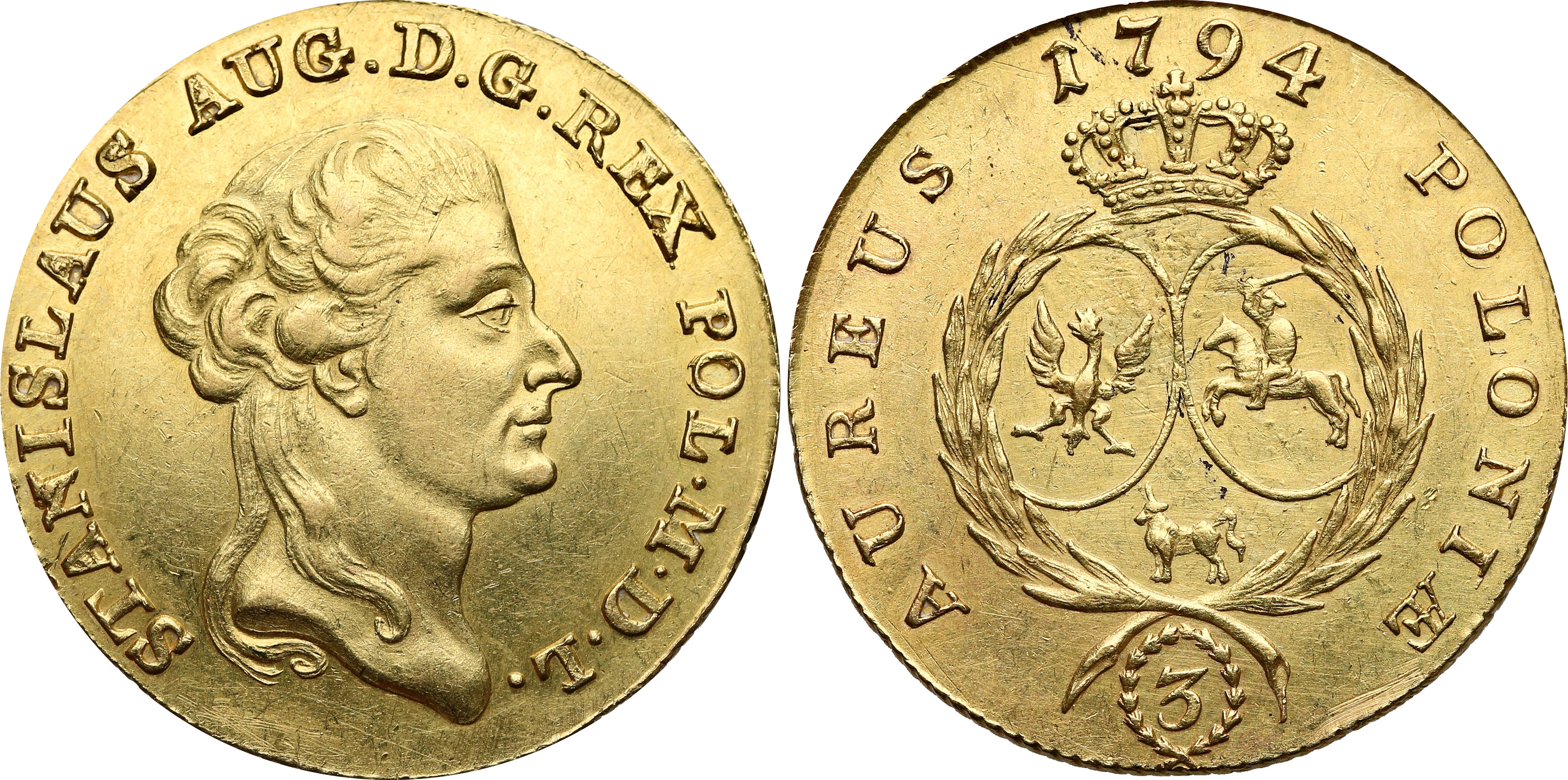
Stanislasdor, 3 ducats (1794)

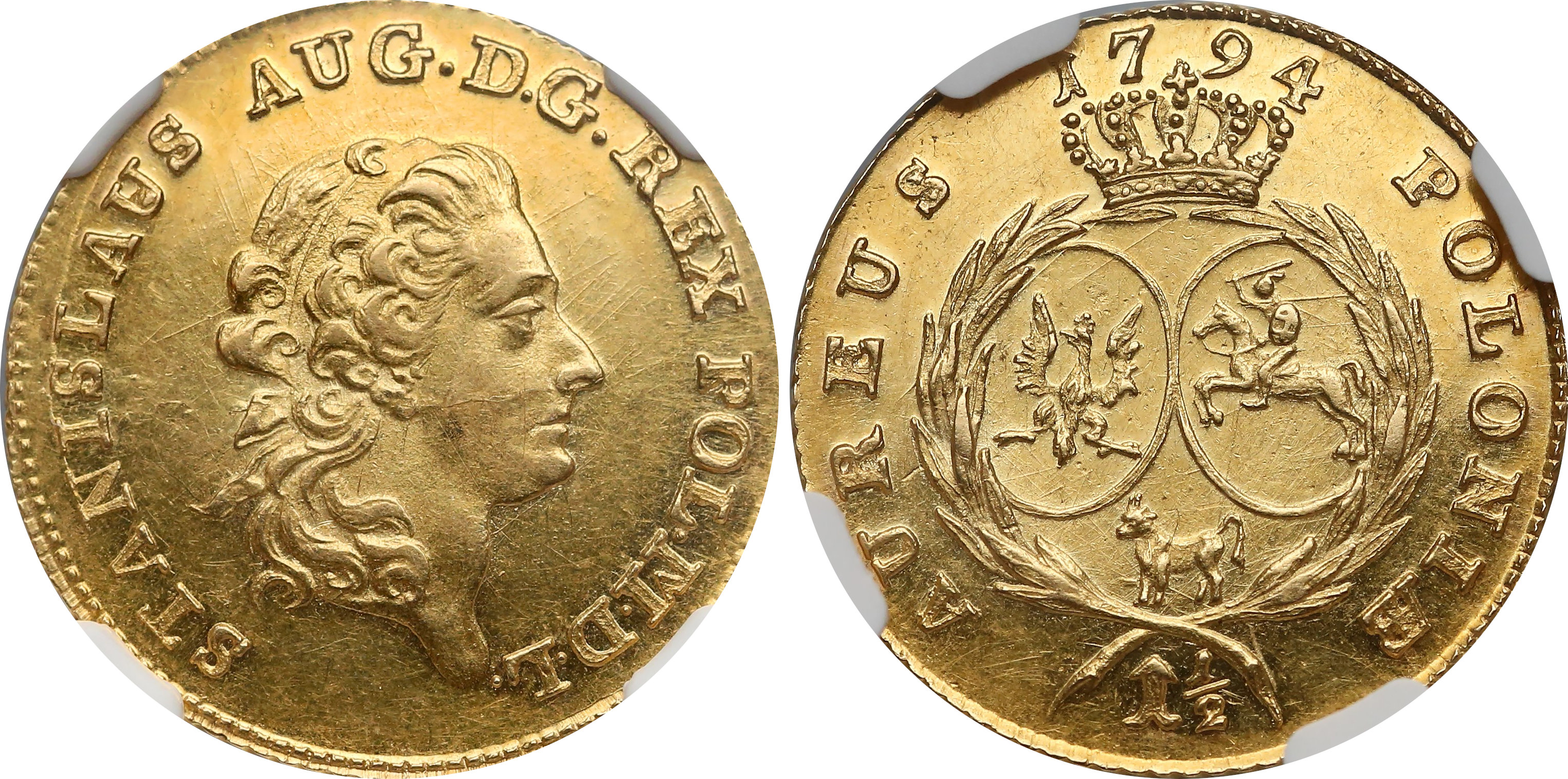
Semi-stanislasdor, 1½ ducats (1794)

A stanislasdor (stanislador, stanislaus d'or; "Golden Stanislaus") was a three-ducat gold coin minted during the reign of Stanisław August Poniatowski in the Polish–Lithuanian Commonwealth. It weighed 12.3449 grams, 833 proof, diameter 29 mm, minted only in 1794, in 5,256 items.

There were also semi-Stanislasdors (półstanislasdor): 1½-ducat gold coins of the same proof, with mass of 6,1724 grams and diameter of 22.3 mm, minted in 8,114 items, also only in 1794.

In older studies, sometimes stanislasdor referred to one and a half ducat, and double stanislasdor referred to three ducats.
