= 50-złoty note =

Denomination of Polish currency

The Polish 50-złoty note is a denomination of Polish currency. It features King Kazimierz III on the obverse on a blue background, and on the reverse shows the old Polish eagle and a scepter.

== History ==
=== Pre-1800s (1794–1815) ===
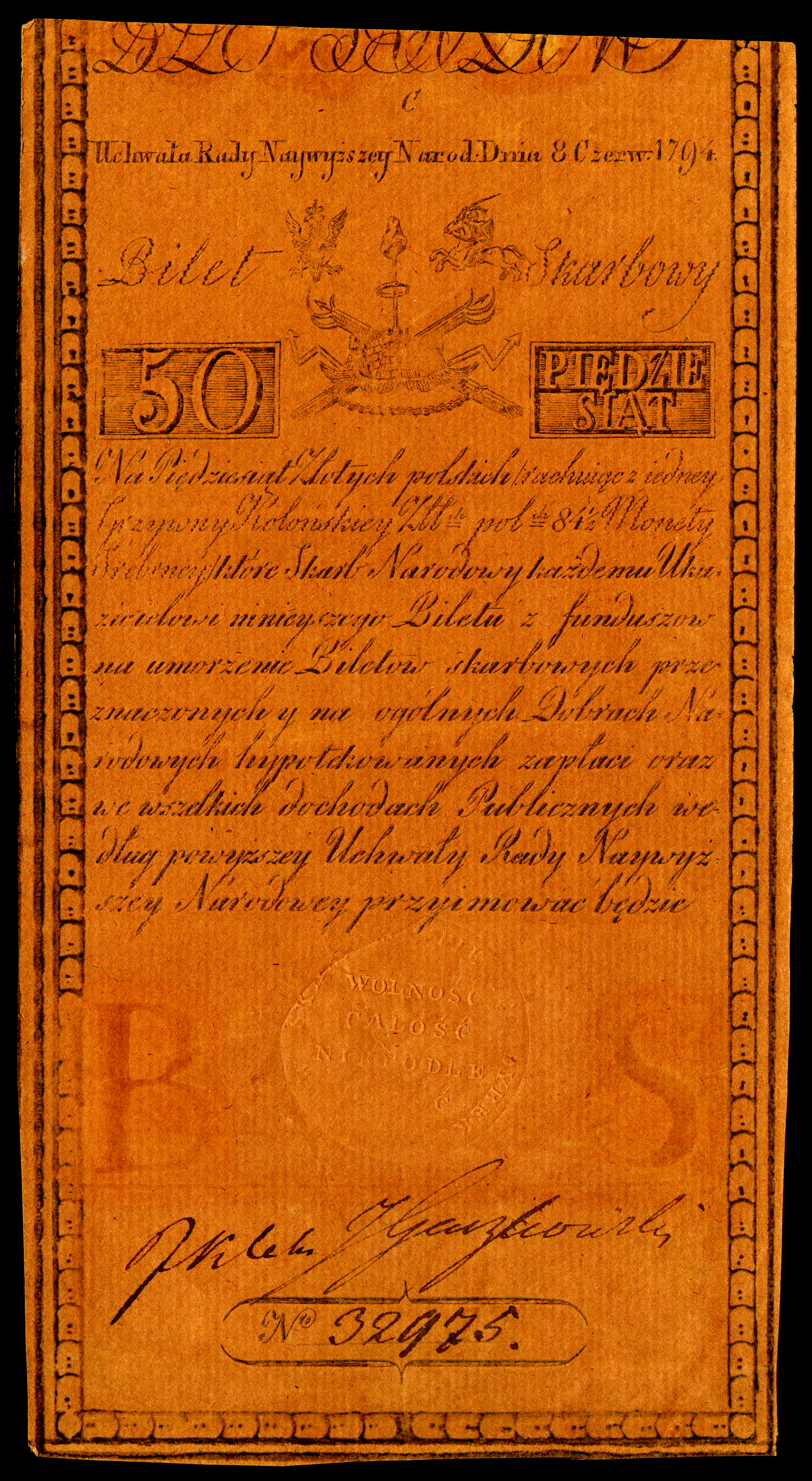
The earliest 50 zloty bill.

Way before even the 20th century, there were the first ever złoty made in 1794. Under Tadeusz Kościuszko, one of the values were 50. It featured an orange background, the value of the bill, followed by a description, and the signature of Aleksander Michałowski. It stopped producing in 1815.

=== Reintroduction to the złoty (1924–1950) ===
After being replaced by the ruble and the marka, the złoty was reintroduced in 1924. And again, there was a 50-złoty banknote. It featured the value of the note in Polish, a red background, and Tadeusz Kościuszko. It stopped producing in 1950.

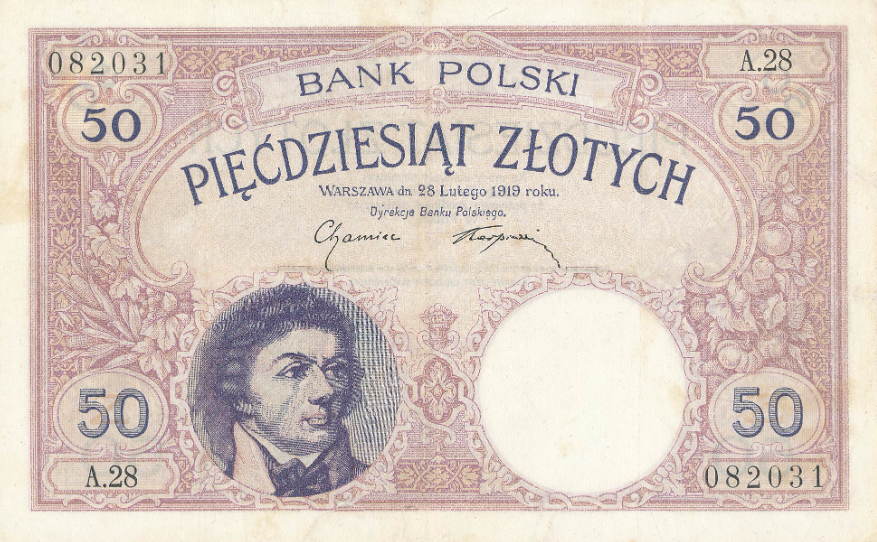
1919 50-złoty note

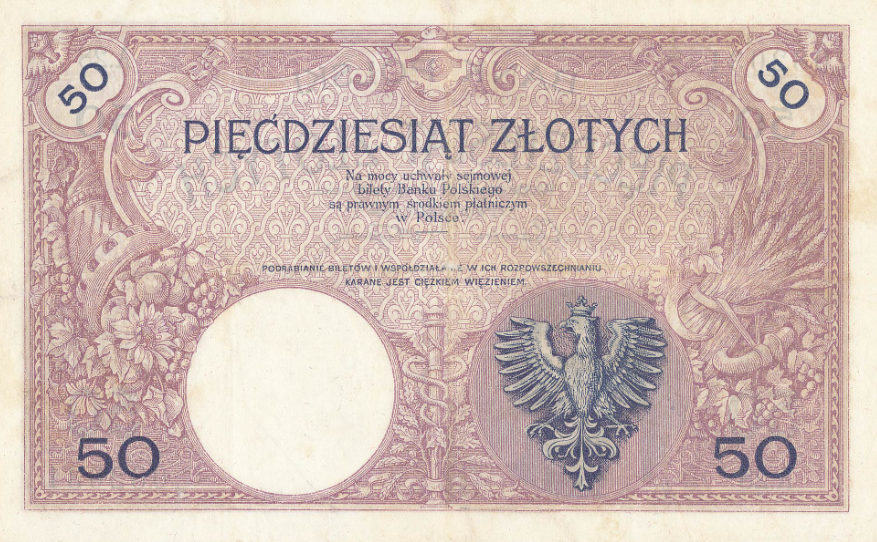
Reverse of the 1919 50-złoty note

=== 1974 series (1974–1995) ===
After the second złoty series was stopped, a third series was made. It features a greenish background topped with yellow, the value of the banknote, about the featured person, and shows Karol Świerczewski. It stopped producing in 1995.

== Collectibles ==
=== 50 złoty coin ===
The 50 złoty coin is an extremely rare coin from 1989–present, worth 50 złoty.

=== Pope John Paul II 50 złoty bill ===
The Pope John Paul II 50 złoty bill is a commemorative bill to Pope John Paul II.

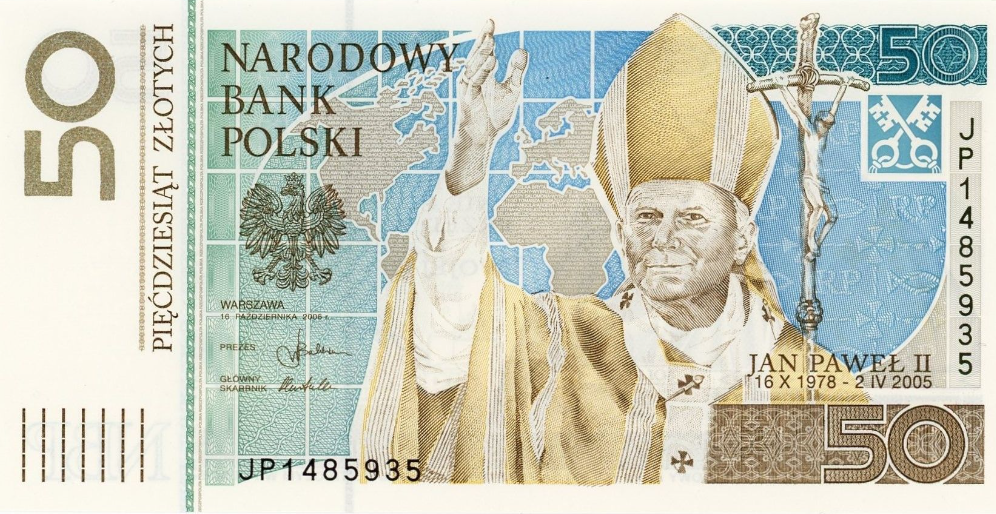
Obverse of Pope John Paul II 50-złoty note

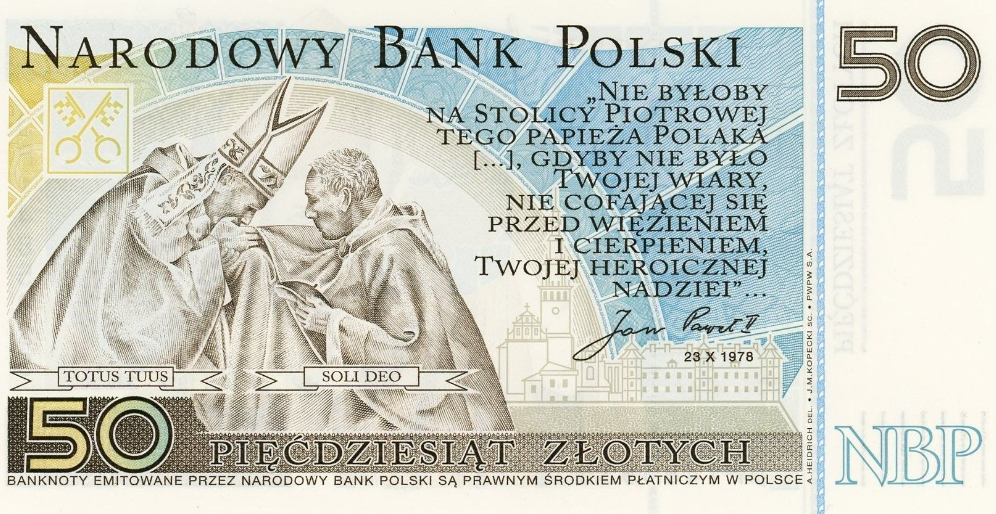
Reverse of Pope John Paul II 50-złoty note
