= 500-złoty note =

Denomination of Polish currency

The Polish 500-złoty note is a denomination of Polish currency. The bill's dimensions are 150 × 75mm. It has been put into circulation on 10 February 2017. The obverse of the note features a likeness of King John III Sobieski. The reverse depicts a crowned eagle and the Wilanów Palace in Warsaw.

It has been designed by Andrzej Heidrich who designed the remaining notes of the 1994/2012 series as well. The banknotes feature a double-letter prefix and a seven-digit serial number.

== History ==
=== First złoty banknotes ===
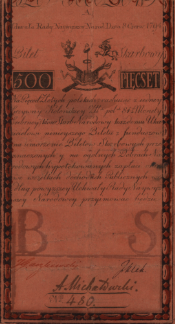
The earliest 500-złoty note.

A 500-złoty note was among the treasury notes issued in 1794.

=== Second złoty banknotes ===
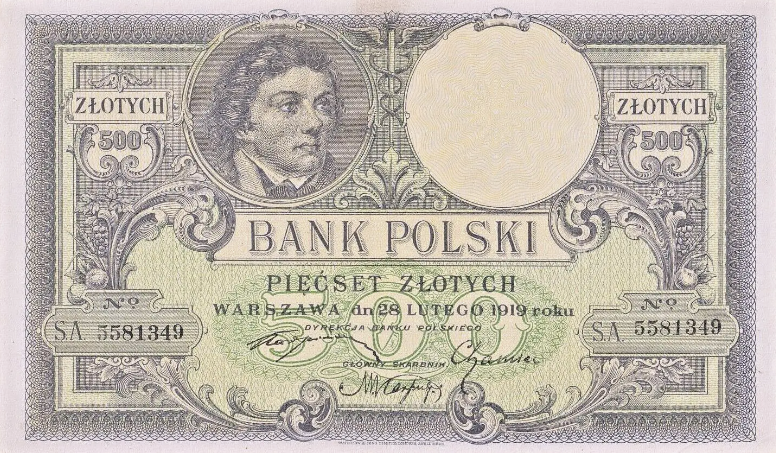
The obverse of the 1919 500-złoty note.

Once the złoty was reinstated in 1924, a 500-złoty note featuring an image of Tadeusz Kościuszko, dated 1919 and printed in advance in United Kingdom, was put into circulation. It was the highest-value note in circulation until the outbreak of World War II.

Under the General Government, the Bank of Issue in Poland issued a 500-złoty note dated 1940.

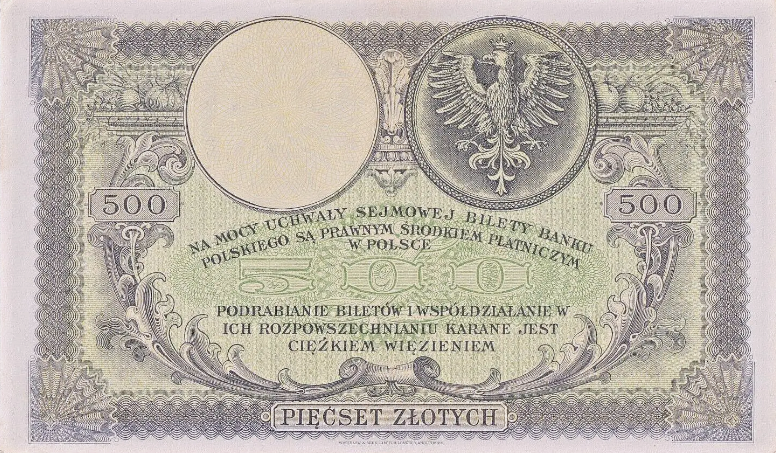
The reverse of the 1919 500-zloty note.

The so-called Lublin series (seria lubelska) of banknotes dated 1944 included a 500-złoty note. It was withdrawn in 1947, earlier than the other notes from the same series, due to being forged particularly often.

Two other 500-złoty notes followed. They were dated 1946 and 1947 and entered circulation in 1946 and 1949, respectively. Both were withdrawn in 1950.

=== Third złoty banknotes ===
In 1950, a series of notes dated 1948 was introduced. It included a 500-złoty note, the largest of the series, that featured a likeness of a miner on the front and three miners at work on the back. These notes circulated between 1950 and 1977. From January 1975 onwards, the 1948 series started being replaced with new, smaller notes. A likeness of Tadeusz Kościuszko was once again chosen for the 500-złoty note. These notes are dated 1974, 1976, 1979, and 1982, the latter ones being issued into the 1990s without the date being changed. They circulated until the end of 1996. Replaced by the fourth złoty, they could be exchanged for the new currency until the end of 2010.

=== Current banknotes ===
In 1995, a new series of notes was introduced. Initially, it included values of 10, 20, 50, 100, and 200 złotych. In 2017, the National Bank of Poland put the 500-złoty note into circulation in order to facilitate cash settlements between individuals, decrease the currency management costs for entrepreneurs and the central bank, as well as allow the bank to improve the management of the supply of circulating banknotes.
