= 100-złoty note =

Denomination of Polish currency

The Polish 100-złoty note is a denomination of Polish currency. With over a billion banknotes of this denomination in circulation as of the end of 2023, it is the most widely circulating banknote.

== History ==
The note was issued in 19 denominations, by the National Bank of Poland (Polish: Narodowy Bank Polski) and date its origins to 1528 as the "ducat," although there is debate about which polish coins was the first zloty. The 20th-century zloty dates back to 1924. The złoty notes were withdrawn from circulation in 1995. The currency was devalued and worth very little after many years of high inflation in Poland during the communist period; when the new zloty currency was introduced in 1995, four zeros were dropped from the currency.
