= Polish coins and banknotes =

Overview of coins and banknotes issued by the Polish govennment

The following coins and banknotes are currently issued by the National Bank of Poland.

== Coins ==
Although some of the coins were minted as early as 1990, they were not released until January 1, 1995, when the złoty was redenominated after hyperinflation was harnessed. There are 100 grosz (gr) to one złoty (zł).

1990 Series
Value	Technical parameters			Description			Date of first minting
Value	Diameter	Mass	Composition	Edge	Obverse	Reverse	Date of first minting
1 grosz	15.5 mm	1.64 g	Steel bronze	Serrated	State title and the eagle of the coat of arms	Value and 1 leaf	1990
2 grosze	17.5 mm	2.13 g	Steel bronze	Plain	State title and the eagle of the coat of arms	Value and 2 leaves	1990
5 groszy	19.5 mm	2.59 g	Steel bronze	Alternately smooth and serrated	State title and the eagle of the coat of arms	Value and 5 leaves	1990
10 groszy	16.5 mm	2.51 g	Cupronickel	Alternately smooth and serrated	State title and the eagle of the coat of arms	Value and (10) encircling leaves	1990
20 groszy	18.5 mm	3.22 g	Cupronickel	Serrated	State title and the eagle of the coat of arms	Value and (20) square-shaped leaves	1990
50 groszy	20.5 mm	3.94 g	Cupronickel	Serrated	State title and the eagle of the coat of arms	Value and (50) leaves in semicircle shape	1990
1 zł	23 mm	5 g	Cupronickel	Alternately smooth and serrated	State title and the eagle of the coat of arms	Value and (100) leaves in full-circle shape	1990
2 zł	21.5 mm Core: 12 mm	5.21 g	Ring: Aluminium bronze Center: Cupronickel	Plain	State title and the eagle of the coat of arms	Value and 2 leaves in the ring portion	1994
5 zł	24 mm Core: 16 mm	6.54 g	Ring: Cupronickel; Center: Aluminium bronze	Irregularly milled	State title and the eagle of the coat of arms	Value and 5 leaves in the ring portion	1994
Note: due to copyright law in Poland the Polish złoty coins may not be freely reproduced.

Modern Versions
Value	Technical parameters			Description			Date of first minting
Value	Diameter	Mass	Composition	Edge	Obverse	Reverse	Date of first minting
1 grosz	15.5 mm	1.64 g	Brass plated steel	Serrated	State title and the eagle of the coat of arms	Value and 1 leaf	2014
2 grosze	17.5 mm	2.13 g	Brass plated steel	Plain	State title and the eagle of the coat of arms	Value and 2 leaves	2014
5 groszy	19.5 mm	2.59 g	Brass plated steel	Alternately smooth and serrated	State title and the eagle of the coat of arms	Value and 5 leaves	2014
10 groszy	16.5 mm	2.51 g	Copper and nickel-plated steel	Alternately smooth and serrated	State title and the eagle of the coat of arms	Value and (10) encircling leaves	2020
20 groszy	18.5 mm	3.22 g	Copper and nickel-plated steel	Serrated	State title and the eagle of the coat of arms	Value and (20) square-shaped leaves	2020
50 groszy	20.5 mm	3.94 g	Copper and nickel-plated steel	Serrated	State title and the eagle of the coat of arms	Value and (50) leaves in semicircle shape	2020
1 zł	23 mm	5 g	Copper and nickel-plated steel	Alternately smooth and serrated	State title and the eagle of the coat of arms	Value and (100) leaves in full-circle shape	2020
2 zł	21.5 mm Core: 12 mm	5.21 g	Ring: Aluminium bronze Center: Cupronickel	Plain	State title and the eagle of the coat of arms	Value and 2 leaves in the ring portion	1994
5 zł	24 mm Core: 16 mm	6.54 g	Ring: Cupronickel; Center: Aluminium bronze	Irregularly milled	State title and the eagle of the coat of arms	Value and 5 leaves in the ring portion	1994
Note: due to copyright law in Poland the Polish złoty coins may not be freely reproduced.

=== Mintage ===
Republic of Poland regular (Note: that is, non-collectible and non-commemorative) coin mintage by year

Year	1 gr	2 gr	5 gr	10 gr	20 gr	50 gr	1 zł	2 zł (Note: excludes the low-mintage commemorative special-issue 2 zł coins made every year since 1995)	5 zł (Note: excludes the low-mintage commemorative special-issue 5 zł coins made since 2014)
1990	29,140,000	34,400,000	70,240,000 (Note: A Mennica Polska's production table in "Pozytywna odpowiedź na niesprzyjające zmiany na rynku" gives 43,240,000 for the 1990 5 groszy while the Fischer catalogue lists 70,240,000. Fischer's value seems more reliable than this Mennica document (see the note for the 1994 5 złoty) so its value has been used.)	43,055,000	25,100,000	29,152,000	20,240,000		
1991	79,000,000	97,410,000	171,040,000	123,164,300	75,400,000	99,120,000	60,080,000		
1992	362,000,000	157,000,003	103,784,000	210,005,000	106,100,001	116,000,000	102,240,000		
1993	80,780,000		20,280,101	80,240,008			20,904,000		
1994							69,956,000	79,644,000	112,896,033 (Note: The NBP and the 2010 Fischer catalogue lists 112,896,033 for the 1994 5 złoty but a Mennica Polska's production table in "Pozytywna odpowiedź na niesprzyjające zmiany na rynku" gives 112,896,003. The NBP's and Fischer's values seem to be the more reliable figure.)
1995	102,280,109					101,600,113	99,740,122	122,880,020	
1996					29,745,000				52,940,003
1997	103,080,002	92,400,002			59,755,000				
1998	257,640,003	154,840,050	93,472,002	62,695,000	52,500,000				
1999	203,970,000	187,900,000	99,024,000	47,040,000	25,985,000				
2000	210,100,000	94,500,000	75,600,000	104,060,000	52,135,000				
2001	210,000,020	84,000,000	67,368,000	62,820,000	41,980,001				
2002	240,000,000	83,910,000	67,200,000	10,500,000	10,500,000				
2003	250,000,000	80,000,000	48,000,000	31,500,000	20,400,000				
2004	300,000,000	100,000,000	62,500,000	70,500,000	40,000,025				
2005	375,000,000	163,003,250	113,000,000	94,000,000	37,000,025			5,000,000	
2006	184,000,000	105,000,000	54,000,000	40,000,000	35,000,000			5,000,000	
2007	330,000,000	160,000,000	116,000,000	100,000,000	68,000,000			20,000,000	
2008	316,000,000	172,000,000	107,000,000	103,000,000	91,000,000	13,000,000	5,000,000	15,000,000	5,000,000
2009	338,000,000	222,000,000	160,000,000	146,000,000	133,000,000	57,000,000	34,000,000	62,000,000	59,000,000
2010	150,000,000	120,000,000	100,000,000	62,000,000	45,000,000	12,000,000	3,000,000	15,000,000	30,000,000
2011	270,000,000	150,000,000	90,000,000	80,000,000	15,000,000	10,000,000			
2012	365,000,000	100,000,000	60,000,000	136,000,000	38,000,000	12,000,000	10,000,000		
2013	323,000,000	150,000,000	88,000,000	142,000,000	36,000,000	30,000,000	21,000,000		
2014a (Note: Polish Mint)	86,000,000	20,000,000	15,000,000	88,000,000	46,000,000	28,400,000	35,250,000	28,000,000	
2014b (Note: Royal Mint)	334,924,900 (Note: includes 1,000,000 pieces of pilot batch production marked the year 2013)	117,084,750	81,004,500						
2015	388,560,000	129,870,000	115,050,000	112,050,000	78,030,000	44,010,000	39,000,000	34,350,000	38,040,000
2016	266,011,103	142,741,600	120,900,100	116,700,000	69,120,000	28,980,000	29,775,000	35,150,000	35,040,000
2017	391,200,000	143,910,000	126,150,000	154,200,000	88,695,000	44,370,000	41,175,000	30,900,000	23,220,000
2018	435,840,000	161,850,000	144,600,000	169,800,000	89,100,000	42,030,000	42,000,000	37,425,000	
2019	413,520,000	167,115,000	116,100,000	128,700,000	58,320,000	54,990,000	60,750,000	27,975,000	
2020	400,080,000	161,460,000	135,000,000	170,100,000	94,230,000	41,580,000	42,000,000	33,525,000	6,436,000
2021	319,440,000	41,925,000	108,450,000	148,200,000	42,795,000	27,900,000	32,325,000	40,950,000	39,480,000
2022	121,920,000		15,000,000	46,950,000	79,515,000	55,440,000	44,250,000	41,325,000	32,160,000
2023	338,880,000	110,370,000	128,550,000	157,050,000	91,800,000	59,490,000	23,625,000	30,225,000	43,180,000
2024	309,360,000	70,005,000	70,050,000	184,500,000	92,205,000	58,680,000	40,050,000	43,050,000	
2025	301,920,000	154,245,000	99,750,000	90,300,000	87,480,000	46,080,000	46,425,000	47,175,000	43,740,000

Source: National Bank of Poland Official coinage

=== Special issue 5zł coins ===
These special issue coins have value and are intended for general circulation.

Commemorative general circulation 5zł coins

Year	Commemorates	Mintage
2014	Royal Castle, Warsaw	1,200,000
2014	25 years of freedom	1,500,000
2015	Poznań Town Hall	1,200,000
2015	Bydgoszcz Canal	1,200,000
2016	Księży Młyn w Łodzi	1,200,000
2016	Ducal Castle, Szczecin	1,200,000
2017	Chapel of the Holy Trinity, Lublin	1,200,000
2017	Central Industrial Region	1,200,000
2018	100th anniversary of regaining independence	38,424,000

== Banknotes ==
1994 Series ("Sovereigns of Poland" First Series)
Value	NBP	Dimensions	Main colour	Description			Date of	
Value	NBP	Dimensions	Main colour	Obverse	Reverse	Watermark	printing	issue
10 zł		120 × 60 mm	Brown and green	Mieszko I	Silver denar coin during the reign of Mieszko I	As portrait	25 March 1994	1 January 1995
20 zł		126 × 63 mm	Violet and pink	Bolesław I Chrobry	Silver denar coin during the reign of Bolesław I Chrobry	As portrait	25 March 1994	1 January 1995
50 zł		132 × 66 mm	Dark blue	Kazimierz III Wielki	White Eagle from the royal seal of Casimir III the Great and the regalia of Poland: sceptre and globus cruciger	As portrait	25 March 1994	1 January 1995
100 zł		138 × 69 mm	Dark green	Władysław II Jagiełło	Shield bearing a White Eagle from the tombstone of Władysław II Jagiełło, coat of the Teutonic Knights and the Grunwald Swords	As portrait	25 March 1994	1 June 1995
200 zł		144 × 72 mm	Brown and orange	Zygmunt I Stary	Eagle intertwined with the letter S in a hexagon, from the Sigismund's Chapel	As portrait	25 March 1994	1 June 1995
Note: due to copyright law in Poland the Polish zloty banknotes may not be freely reproduced.

2012 Series ("Sovereigns of Poland" Second Series)
Value	NBP	Dimensions	Main colour	Description			Date of	
Value	NBP	Dimensions	Main colour	Obverse	Reverse	Watermark	printing	issue
10 zł		120 × 60 mm	Brown and green	Mieszko I	Silver denar coin during the reign of Mieszko I, romanesque columns from the Tyniec Abbey	As portrait	5 January 2012	7 April 2014
20 zł		126 × 63 mm	Violet and pink	Bolesław I Chrobry	Silver denar coin during the reign of Bolesław I Chrobry, Rotunda of Saint Nicolas in Cieszyn, a lion from the Gniezno Doors	As portrait	5 January 2012	7 April 2014
50 zł		132 × 66 mm	Dark blue	Kazimierz III Wielki	White Eagle from the royal seal of Casimir III the Great and the regalia of Poland: sceptre and globus cruciger, views of Kraków and Kazimierz by Hartmann Schedel	As portrait	5 January 2012	7 April 2014
100 zł		138 × 69 mm	Dark green	Władysław II Jagiełło	Shield bearing a White Eagle from the tombstone of Władysław II Jagiełło, coat of the Teutonic Knights and the Grunwald Swords, Malbork Castle	As portrait	5 January 2012	7 April 2014
200 zł		144 × 72 mm	Brown and orange	Zygmunt I Stary	Eagle intertwined with the letter S in a hexagon, from the Sigismund's Chapel, and main courtyard of the Wawel Castle	As portrait	30 March 2015	12 February 2016
500 zł		150 × 75 mm	Violet, gray, blue, yellow, and green	Jan III Sobieski	Wilanow Palace, coat of arms from the reign of John III Sobieski	As portrait	16 February 2016	10 February 2017
Note: due to copyright law in Poland the Polish złoty banknotes may not be freely reproduced.

== Commemorative banknotes ==
Commemorative Series
Value	Dimensions	Main colour	Description			Number issued	Date of issue
Value	Dimensions	Main colour	Obverse	Reverse	Watermark	Number issued	Date of issue
50 zł	144 × 72 mm	Blue, yellow	Pope John Paul II, Polish coat of arms	Cardinal Stefan Wyszynski, a quotation from Letter to Poles, Jasna Góra Monastery and church	Papal arms of John Paul II	2,000,000	October 16, 2006
10 zł	138 × 69 mm	Pink, orange	Polish coat of arms, Belweder Palace, Commander Józef Piłsudski	White eagle, Monument of the Heroic Deed of Polish Legions in Kielce.	Józef Piłsudski, electrotype denomination	80,000	November 3, 2008
20 zł	138 × 69 mm	Orange, yellow, brown	Polish coat of arms, Chalet in Krzemieniec, Juliusz Słowacki	Cranes, an excerpt of the poem Sedation, Statue of Sigismund III Vasa at Castle Square in Warsaw.	Juliusz Słowacki, electrotype denomination	80,000	September 23, 2009
20 zł	138 × 69 mm	Light blue, Light brown, black	Frédéric Chopin, the mansion in Zelazowa where the composer was born, reproduction of the first edition of Mazurka in B-flat major, Opus 7 No 1, Chopin's autograph.	Facsimile of a fragment of Étude in f-minor, Opus 10, No 9, landscape in Central Poland with Masovian willows.	Chopin	120,000	February 26, 2010
20 zł	138 × 69 mm	Brown and green	Marie Skłodowska Curie, Sorbona w Paryżu (Sorbonne school building in Paris), Coat of arms, Ra (atomic symbol for radium) in SPARK patch in concentric circles.	Quotation by Marie Skłodowska Curie ("I have detected the radium, but not created it; the glory does not belong to me, but it is the property of the whole mankind."), Instytut Radowy w Warszawie (Radium Institute building in Warsaw); Nobel Prize medal for chemistry.	Marie Skłodowska Curie and electrotype denomination	60,000	December 12, 2011
20 zł	147 × 67 mm	Green, brown, yellow and blue	Belvedere Palace hologram; coat of arms with crowned eagle; Commander Józef Klemens Piłsudski wearing military uniform.	Eagle badge of the Polish Legions; Grand Cross (with Star) of the Order of Virtuti Militari; badge of the First Brigade of the Polish Legions; Belvedere Palace hologram.	None	50,000	August 5, 2014
20 zł	138 × 69 mm	Brown, green, gold and violet	1415 as registration device; open book; coat of arms with crowned eagle; Jan Długosz	Wieniawa coat of arms; Wawel cathedral in Kraków; stained glass window	Shield with crowned eagle	30,000	August 24, 2015
20 zł	144 × 77 mm	Blue and red	Coat of arms with crowned eagle; Dobrawa (Doubravka of Bohemia) and King Miezko I; ornate cross; floor plan of church as registration device	Floor plan of church; Gniezno Cathedral; royal chalice of Trzemeszno	Unknown with electrotype 20	35,000	April 12, 2016
20 zł	150 × 77 mm	Blue	Crowns of the Black Madonna of Częstochowa	Drawing of Częstochowa in 1717, depicting the coronation event	Coat of arms of the Pauline Fathers	55,000	August 21, 2017
20 zł	150 × 77 mm		Józef Klemens Piłsudski, Cross of the Order of Polonia Restituta	Flag of Poland, badge of the Polish Military Organization		50,000	August 31, 2018
19 zł	150 × 77 mm		Ignacy Jan Paderewski and a stylized image of the Order of the White Eagle; word niepodległa (“independent”)	Current headquarters of the Polish Security Printing Works		55,000	October 2, 2019
20 zł	150 × 77 mm	Brown-green, blue	Eastern border landscape with helicopter	Officer and soldier of the Border Guard		80,000	July 19, 2022

== See also ==
- Poland and the euro
- Polish złoty
- Commemorative coins of Poland
