= Sadlowski =

Sadlowski may refer to:

== People ==
=== Surname ===
- Edward Sadlowski (1938-2018), American labor activist
- Jamie Sadlowski (born 1988), Canadian professional long driver
- Julian Puterman-Sadłowski (1892-1953), Polish architect and academic lecturer
- Susan Sadlowski Garza, a member of the Chicago City Council
- Władysław Sadłowski (1869-1940), Polish architect
