= 10 złotych =

10 złotych may refer to:

- 10 złotych note, Poland
- 10 złotych coin, Poland
