= Coat of arms of Poland =

- Armiger: Republic of Poland
- Adopted: c. 1000 (first version); 29 March 1928 (current design); 22 February 1990 (last modified)
- Shield: Gules, an eagle argent, armed, crowned and beaked or, langued argent

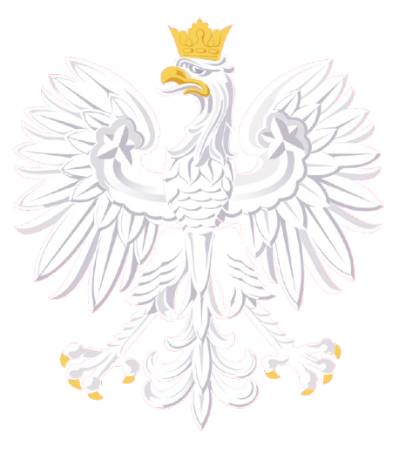
Eagle on the (current) official coat of arms of the republic of Poland

The coat of arms of Poland (Note: Polish: Godło Polskie) is the heraldic symbol representing Poland. The current version was adopted in 1990. It is a white, crowned eagle with a golden beak and talons, on a red background.

In Poland, the coat of arms as a whole is referred to as godło both in official documents and colloquial speech, despite the fact that other coats of arms are usually called a herb (e.g. the Nałęcz herb or the coat of arms of Finland). This stems from the fact that in Polish heraldry, the word godło (plural: godła) means only a heraldic charge (in this particular case a white crowned eagle) and not an entire coat of arms, but it is also an archaic word for a national symbol of any sort. In later legislation only the herb retained this designation; it is unknown why.

== Legal basis ==
The coat of arms of the Republic of Poland is described in two legal documents: the Constitution of the Republic of Poland of 1997 and the Coat of Arms, Colors and Anthem of the Republic of Poland, and State Seals Act (Ustawa o godle, barwach i hymnie Rzeczypospolitej Polskiej oraz o pieczęciach państwowych) of 1980 with subsequent amendments (henceforth referred to as "the Coat of Arms Act").

The Crown was restored on December 31, 1989, by the Act of December 29, 1989 amending the Constitution of the Polish People's Republic (Article 1, point 19). However, the new emblem design was introduced only on February 22, 1990, by the Act of February 9, 1990 amending the provisions on the coat of arms, colors and anthem of the Republic of Poland.

Legislation concerning the national symbols is far from perfect. The Coat of Arms Act has been amended several times and refers extensively to executive ordinances, some of which have never been issued. Moreover, the Act contains errors, omissions and inconsistencies which make the law confusing, open to various interpretations and often not followed in practice.

== Design ==
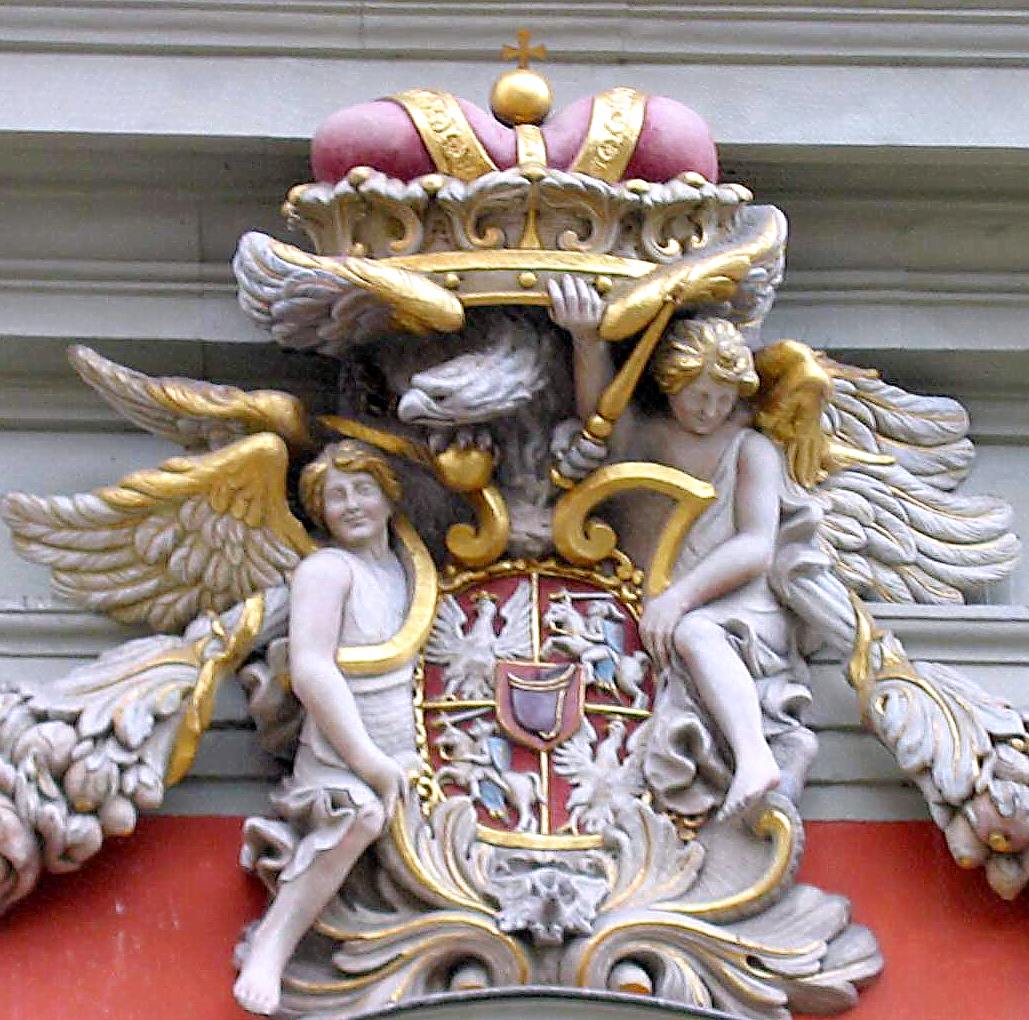
John III Sobieski's coat of arms crowning the Royal Chapel in Gdańsk

According to Chapter I, Article 28, paragraph 1 of the Constitution, the coat of arms of Poland is an image of a crowned white eagle in a red field. The Coat of Arms Act, Article 4, further specifies that the crown, as well as the eagle's beak and talons, are golden. The eagle's wings are outstretched and its head is turned to its right. In English heraldic terminology, the arms are blazoned as Gules an eagle crowned, beaked and armed Or. In contrast to classic heraldry, where the same blazon may be rendered into varying designs, the Coat of Arms Act allows only one official rendering of the national coat of arms. The official design may be found in attachment no. 1 to the Coat of Arms Act.

The nearly circular charge, i.e., the image of the white eagle, is highly stylized. The heraldic bird is depicted with its wings and legs outstretched, its head turned to the right, in a pose known in heraldry as 'displayed'. The eagle's plumage, as well as its tongue and leg scales are white with gradient shading suggestive of a bas-relief. Each wing is adorned with a curved band extending from the bird's torso to the upper edge of the wing, terminating in a heraldic cinquefoil (a stylized five-leafed plant). Three of its leaves are embossed like a trefoil (note similar trefoils in the medieval designs of the eagle). In heraldic terms, the eagle is "armed", that is to say, its beak and talons are rendered in gold, in contrast to the body. The crown on the eagle's head consists of a base and three fleurons extending from it. The base is adorned with three roughly rectangular gemstones. The fleurons – of which the two outer ones are only partly visible – have the shape of a fleur-de-lis. The entire crown, including the gems, as well as spaces between the fleurons, is rendered in gold.

The charge is placed in an escutcheon (shield) of the Modern French type. It is a nearly rectangular upright isosceles trapezoid, rounded at the bottom, whose upper base is slightly longer than the lower one, from the middle of which extends downwards a pointed tip. Although the shield is an integral part of the coat of arms, Polish law stipulates, in certain cases, to only use the charge without the escutcheon. The shades of the principal tinctures, white (Argent) and red (Gules), which are the national colors of Poland, are specified as coordinates in the CIE 1976 color space (see Flag of Poland – National colors for details).

== History ==
According to legend, the White Eagle emblem originated when Poland's legendary founder Lech saw a white eagle's nest. When he looked at the bird, a ray of sunshine from the red setting sun fell on its wings, so they appeared tipped with gold, the rest of the eagle was pure white. He was delighted and decided to settle there and placed the eagle on his emblem. He also named the place Gniezdno (currently Gniezno) from the Polish word gniazdo ("nest").

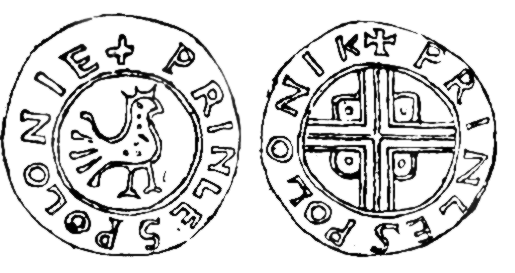
Chrobry denarius with a heraldic bird, about 1000 AD

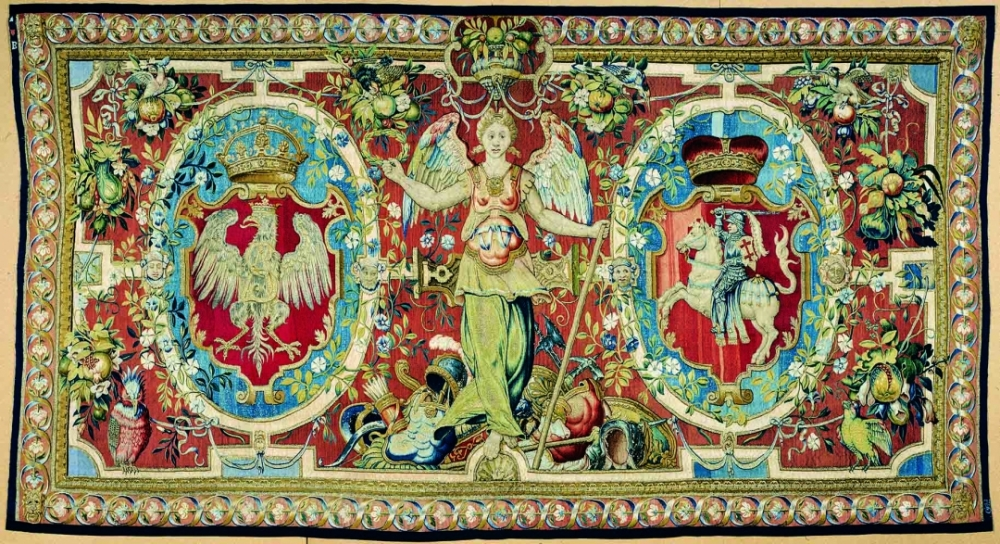
Tapestry with the coats of arms of the Crown of the Kingdom of Poland and Lithuania, c. 1555

The symbol of an eagle appeared for the first time on the coins made during the reign of Bolesław I (992–1025), initially as the coat of arms of the Piast dynasty. Beginning in the 12th century, the eagle has appeared on the shields, ensigns, coins, and seals of the Piast dukes. It appeared on the Polish coat of arms during Przemysł II reign as a reminder of the Piast tradition before the fragmentation of Poland.

The eagle's graphic form has changed throughout centuries. Its recent shape, accepted in 1927, was designed by professor Zygmunt Kamiński and was based on the eagle's form from the times of Stefan Batory's reign. It was adapted to stamps or round shields rather than to a rectangular shape.

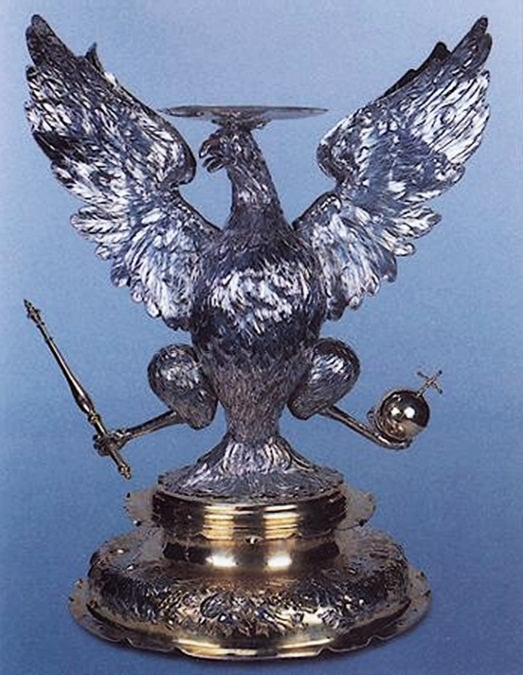
A silver heraldic base for King John Casimir's crown, c. 1666

The arms of the Polish–Lithuanian Commonwealth was quartered, with Polish eagle and Lithuanian Pogonia on opposite sides. Kings used to place their own emblems in escutcheon point (i.e., House Vasa).

Despite the fact that new emblems were given to provinces established by the invaders after the partitions of Poland, the White Eagle remained there with or without crown and occasionally with face turned towards left and in some exceptions with Pogonia. But in most cases they were combined with the invader's emblem.

The Poles conscientiously collected coins from the pre-partitions period with the eagle on their obverse and reverse. The symbol of the eagle, often with Pogonia, appeared on numerous flags and emblems of the November Uprising.

The resurrection of the Polish Kingdom (Polish Regency) in the territories of the former Congress Poland (which had been partitioned and annexed by the Russian Empire as the Vistula Land in 1867) was approved by Austria-Hungary and Wilhelm II's Germany in 1916. A year later, the first Polish banknotes (Polish Marka) with Crowned Eagle on an indivisible shield were introduced. After regaining total independence and the creation of the Second Polish Republic (1918–1939) the White Eagle was implemented by the act of 1919. The official image of the coat of arms (which resembled the emblem of Stanislaus Augustus) was redesigned in 1927 by Zygmunt Kamiński. This design was introduced by law on 13 December of that year before coming into effect on 29 March 1928. According to the research of Polish heraldist Jerzy Michta published in 2017, the version designed by Kamiński was actually plagiarized from a 1924 medal by Elisa Beetz-Charpentier made in honor of Ignacy Paderewski.

After World War II, the communist authorities of the Polish People's Republic removed the crown from the eagle's head. Still, Poland was one of the few countries in the Eastern Bloc with no communist symbols (red stars, ears of wheat, hammers, etc.) on either its flag or its coat of arms. The crownless design was approved by resolution in 1955. To counter that, the Polish government in exile introduced a new emblem with a cross added atop the crown. After the fall of communism in 1989, the coat of arms was swiftly redesigned by Andrzej Heidrich using the Kamiński's design as a basis. The modifications include the removal of the yellow border around the shield and changing the cinquefoils that adorned the upper edges of the eagle's wings from resembling stars to be in the shape of a trefoil. The crown was also returned to the eagle's head. The redesigned coat of arms was adopted by law on 22 February 1990.

The eagle appears on many public administration buildings, it is present in schools and courts. Furthermore, it is placed on the obverse of Polish coins. However the issue on which conditions it should be exposed and how it should be interpreted is the topic of numerous debates in Poland. The eagle was formerly on the Poland national football team's shirts; a new shirt without the eagle was introduced in November 2011, prompting complaints from fans and president Bronisław Komorowski. Due to this overwhelming public pressure, the football shirts were redesigned with the eagle reinstated in the centre of the shirt in December 2011.

=== Evolution ===
Period	Dates used	Coat of arms	Banner of arms	Description and blazon
Duchy of Poland	966–1025			Emblem of Civitas Schinesghe (1000 AD) from Coins of Boleslaus I of Poland.
Kingdom of Poland	1295–1371			Coat of arms of Piast dynasty.
Union of Poland and Hungary	1370–1382			Coat of arms used under Louis I of Hungary. Party per cross, quarterly 1st, barry of eight Gules and argent (for Árpáds) and azure semé-de-lis or with label gules (for Capetian Anjou); 2nd, Gules, an eagle argent, crowned or; 3rd, impaling Gules on a Mount Vert a Crown Or issuant therefrom a double-Cross Argent (for Hungary); 4th, azure three Lions' Heads affronté Crowned Or (for Dalmatia)
Kingdom of Poland	1217–1371			The Kingdom of Poland and the Grand Duchy of Lithuania joined in a personal union established by the Union of Krewo (1385). Quarterly 1st and 4th Gules, an eagle argent, crowned or; 2nd and 3rd, Gules, Pogonia.
Polish–Lithuanian Commonwealth	1217–1371			The Kingdom of Poland and the Grand Duchy of Lithuania joined in a personal union established by the Union of Krewo (1385). Quarterly 1st and 4th Gules, an eagle argent, crowned or; 2nd and 3rd, Gules, Pogonia.
Polish–Lithuanian Commonwealth	1217–1371			Throughout the Polish Lithuanian Commonwealth, the inescutcheon was changed to contain the Coat of Arms of the monarch. The inescutcheon here, Azure, three fleurs-de-lis or, belonged to Henry III of France
Polish–Lithuanian Commonwealth	1573–1575			Throughout the Polish Lithuanian Commonwealth, the inescutcheon was changed to contain the Coat of Arms of the monarch. The inescutcheon here, Azure, three fleurs-de-lis or, belonged to Henry III of France
Polish–Lithuanian Commonwealth	1576–1586			Stephen Báthory
Polish–Lithuanian Commonwealth	1587–1668			House of Vasa (Waza).
Polish–Lithuanian Commonwealth	1669–1673			Michał Korybut Wiśniowiecki
Polish–Lithuanian Commonwealth	1674–1696			John III Sobieski
Polish–Lithuanian Commonwealth	1697–1704 1709–1763			House of Wettin
Polish–Lithuanian Commonwealth	1704–1709			Stanisław Leszczyński
Polish–Lithuanian Commonwealth	1764–1795			Stanisław August Poniatowski
Duchy of Warsaw	1807–1815			Coat of arms of House of Wettin and Polish eagle.
Kingdom of Poland	1815–1832			Coat of arms of Congress Poland
Grand Duchy of Posen	1815–1848			Prussian eagle inescutcheon with Polish eagle.
Polish National Government	1830–1831			Polish eagle and Pogonia
Polish independence movement	1846			
Polish National Government	1863–1865			Archangel Michael represents Ruthenia
Vistula Land	1867–1915			
Government General of Warsaw	1915–1918			Seal of the Government-General of Warsaw, includes a Prussian eagle.
Kingdom of Poland	1916–1918			Eagle with the seal of the Regency Council
Second Polish Republic	1919–1928			First modern coat of arms of Poland.
Second Polish Republic and Polish Government in exile	1928–1939, 1939–1956			Zygmunt Kamiński's current project
Polish Government in exile	1956–1990			The crown was redesigned as close crown.
Polish People's Republic	1955–1980			Crown was removed.
Polish People's Republic	1980–1990			Current colors.

==== Monarchs of Poland ====
Jadwiga of Poland

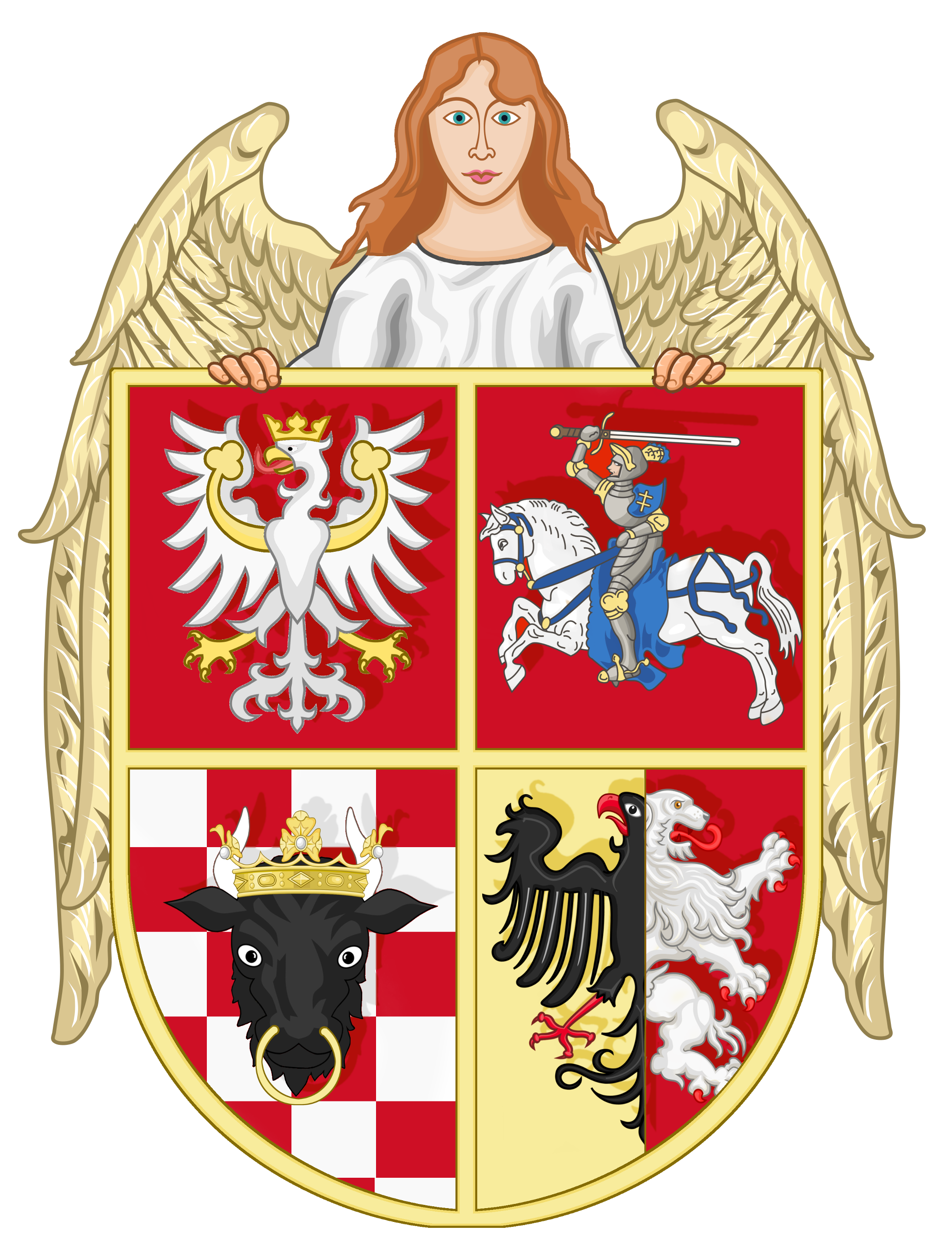
Władysław II Jagiełło (Jogaila)

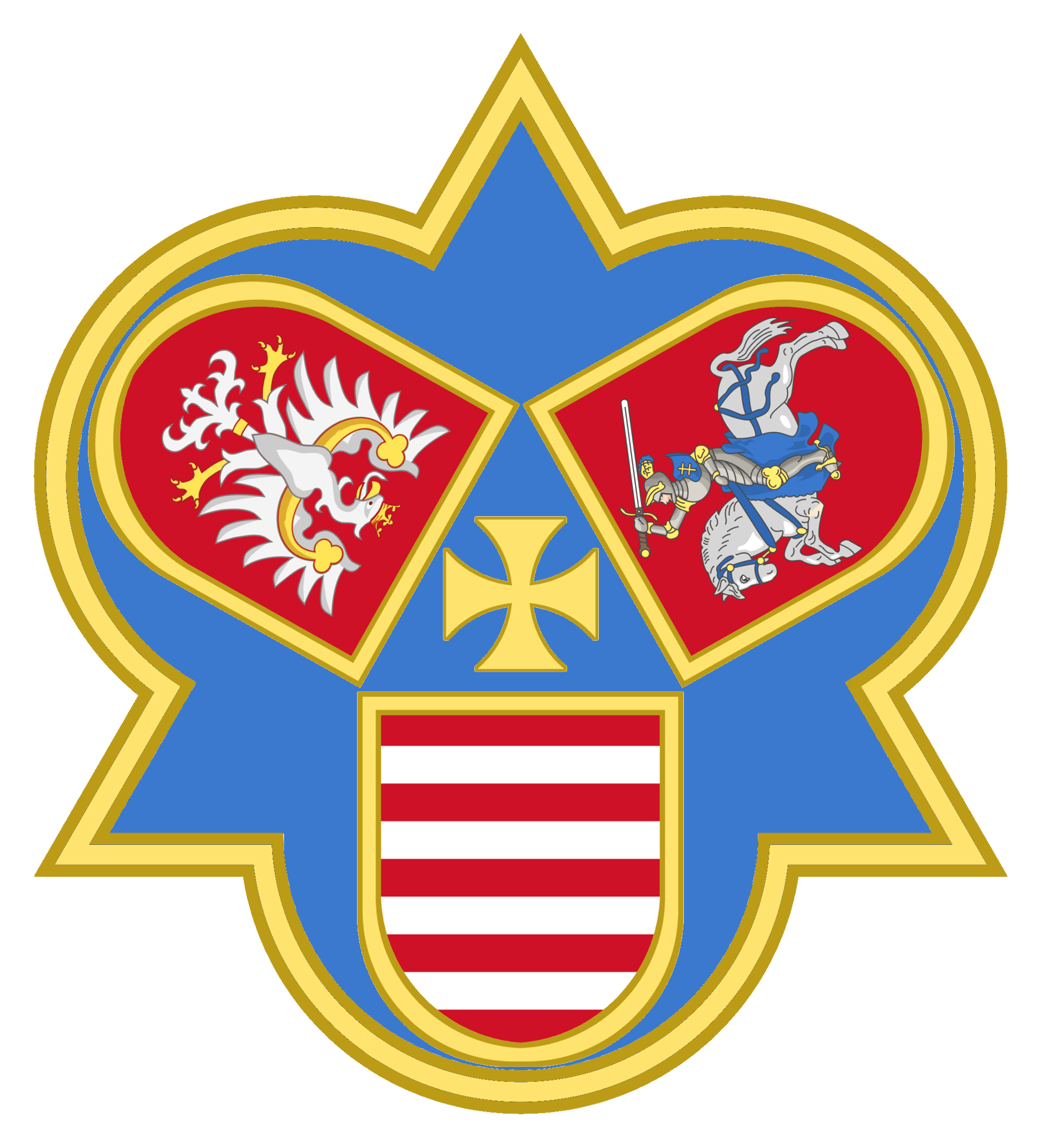
Władysław III of Poland

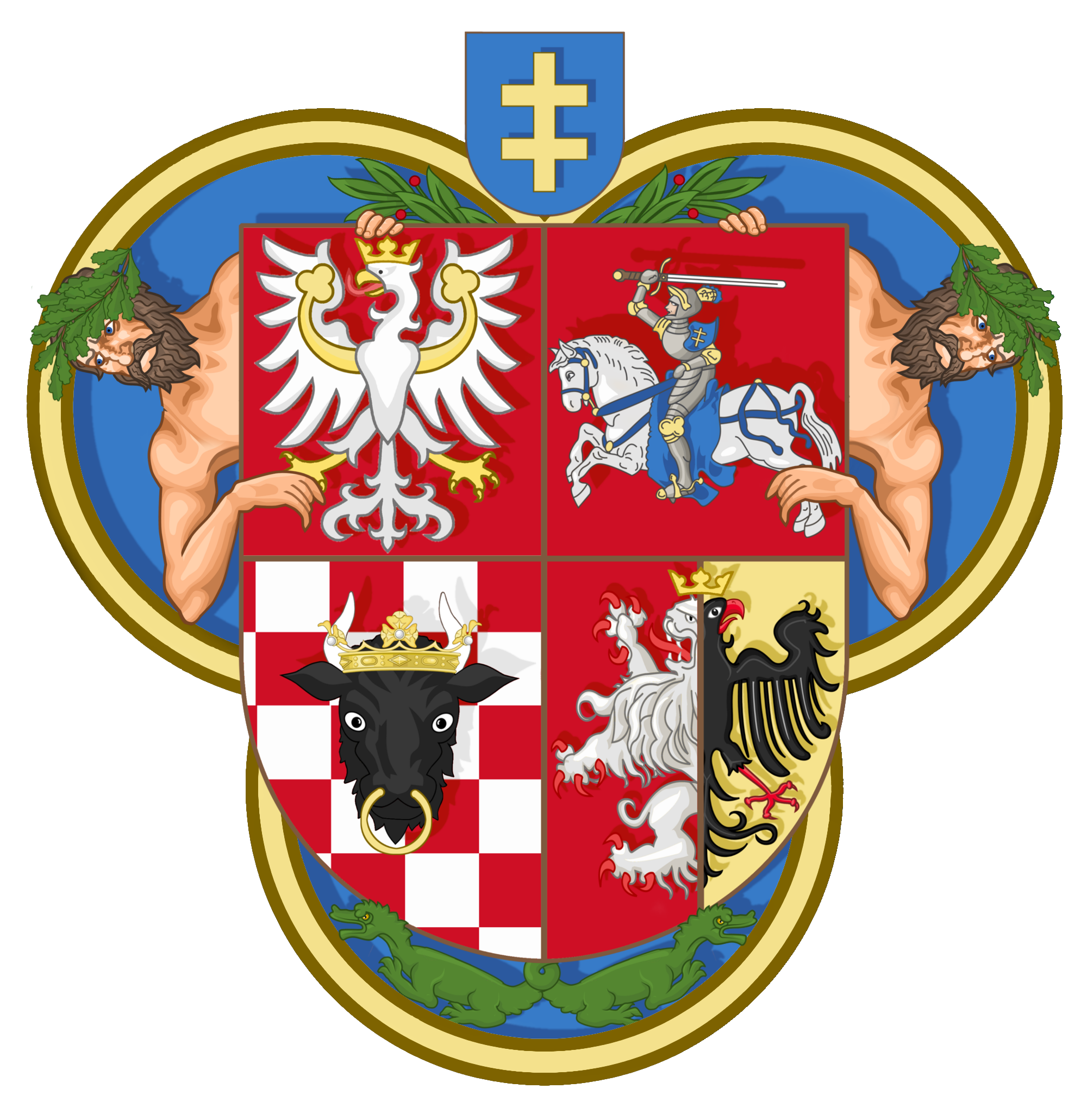
Casimir IV Jagiellon

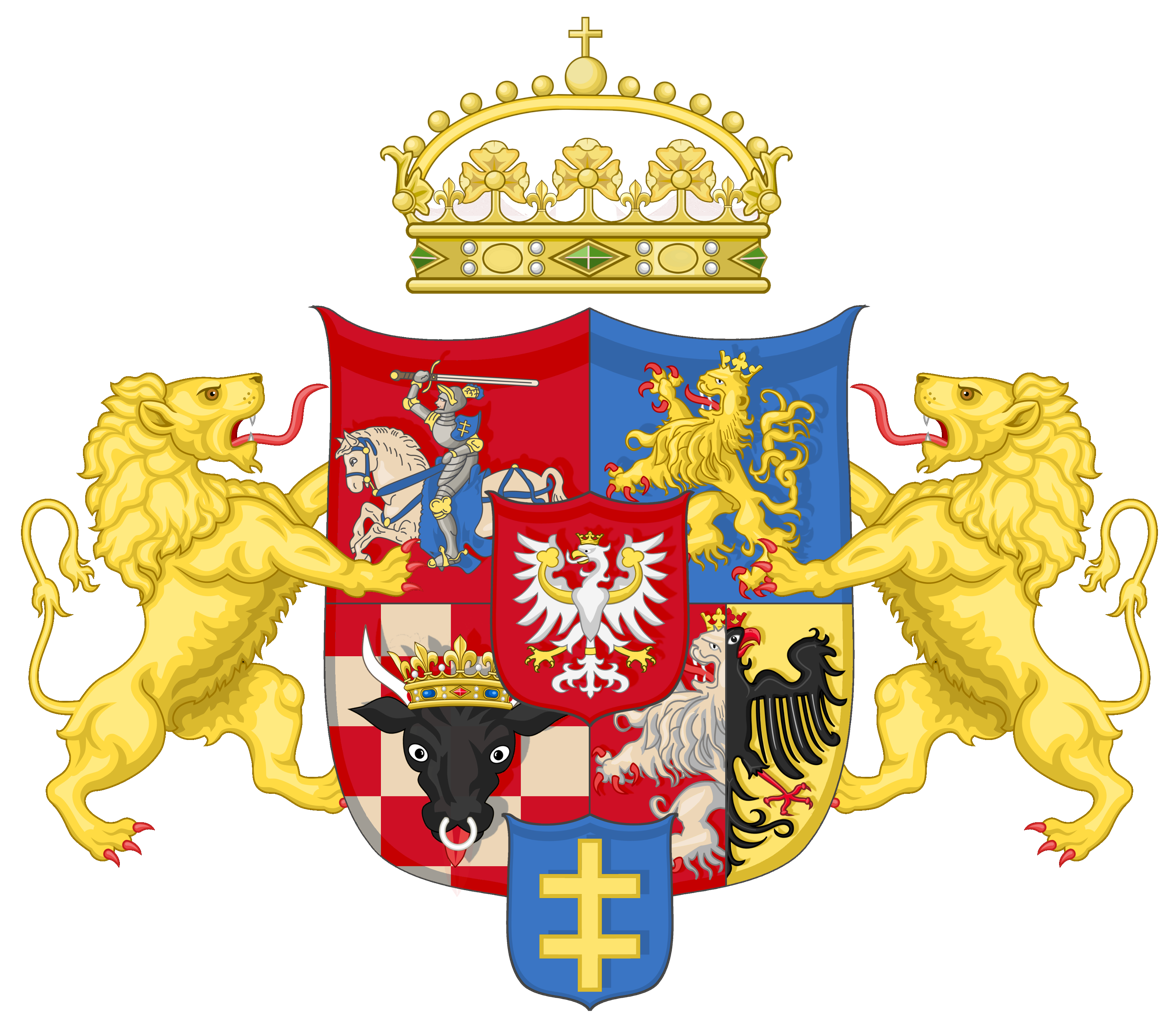
John I Albert

Alexander Jagiellon

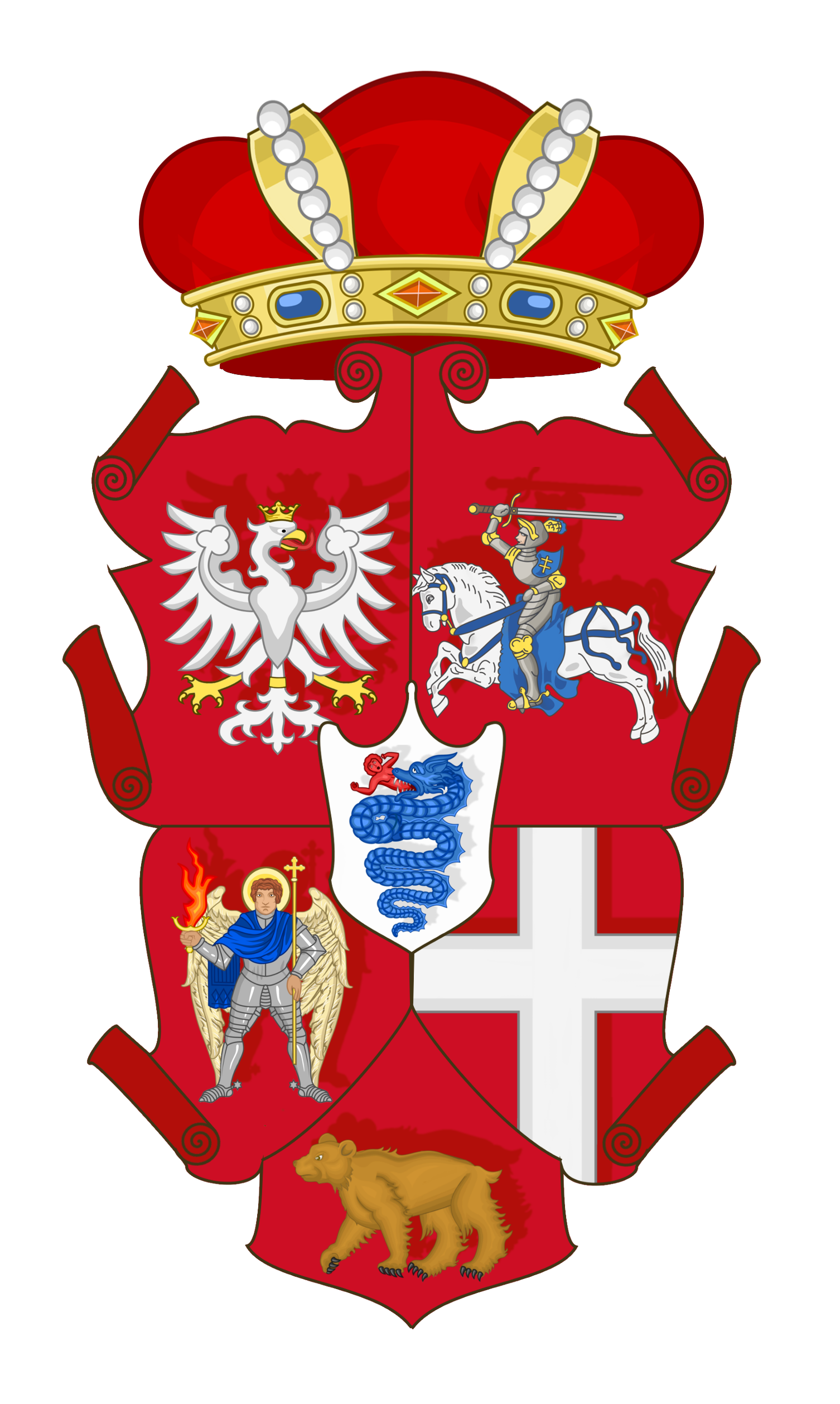
Sigismund II Augustus

Henryk Walezy

Sigismund III Vasa

==== Restored Poland ====
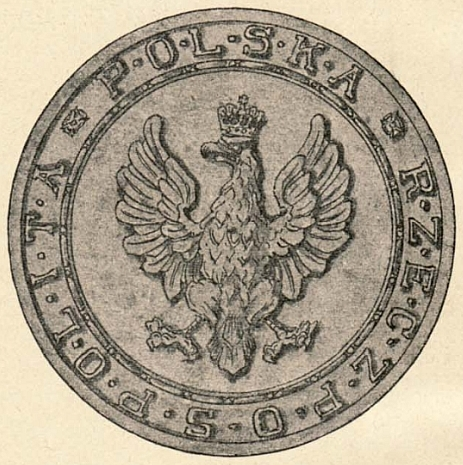
Template of the white eagle in the coat of arms of Poland (1919–1928)

Coat of arms of Republic of Central Lithuania (1920–1922)

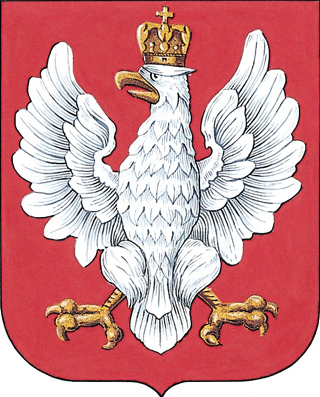
Official Polish coat of arms (1919–1928) according to the law

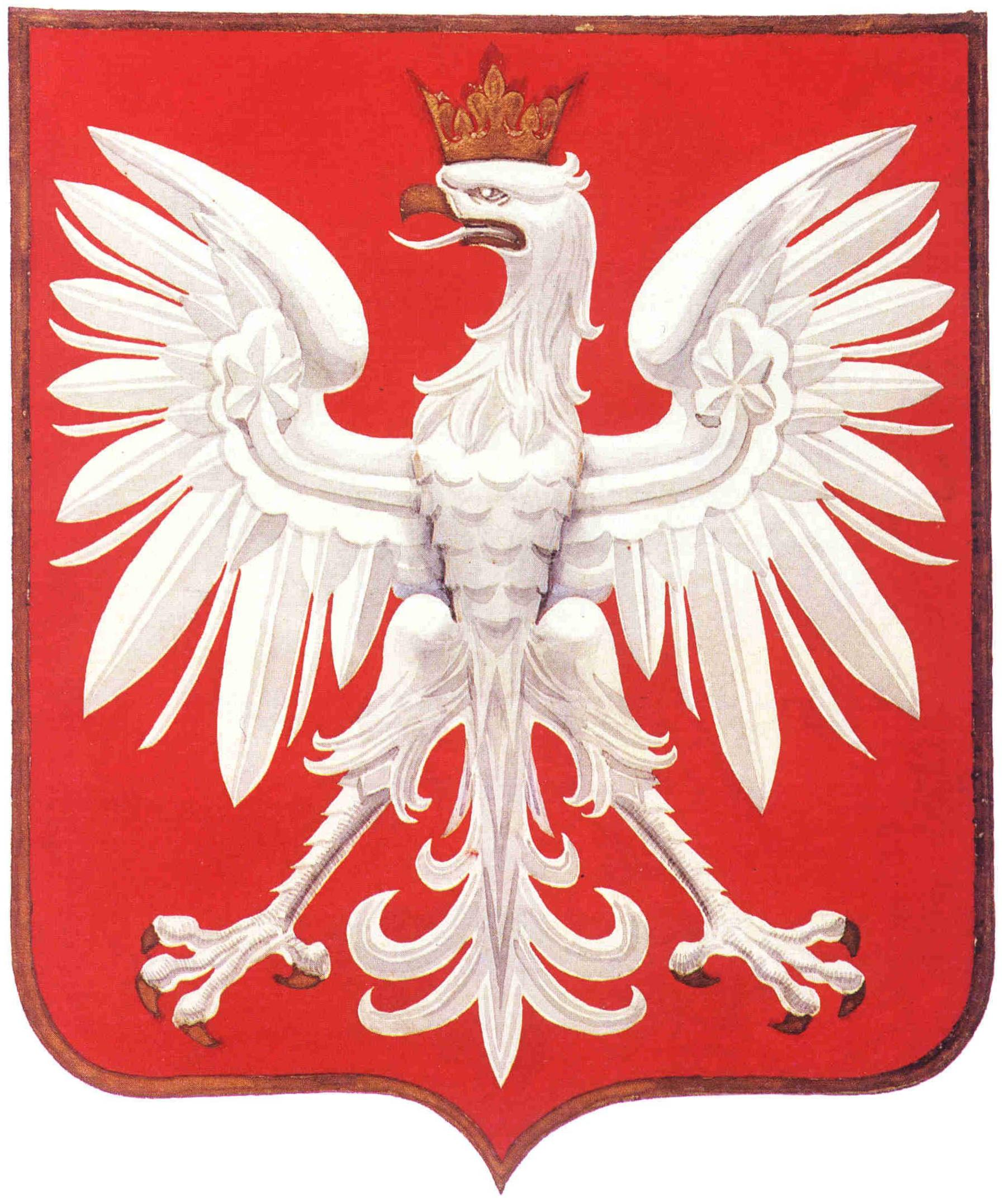
Zygmunt Kamiński's original proposed design (1927)

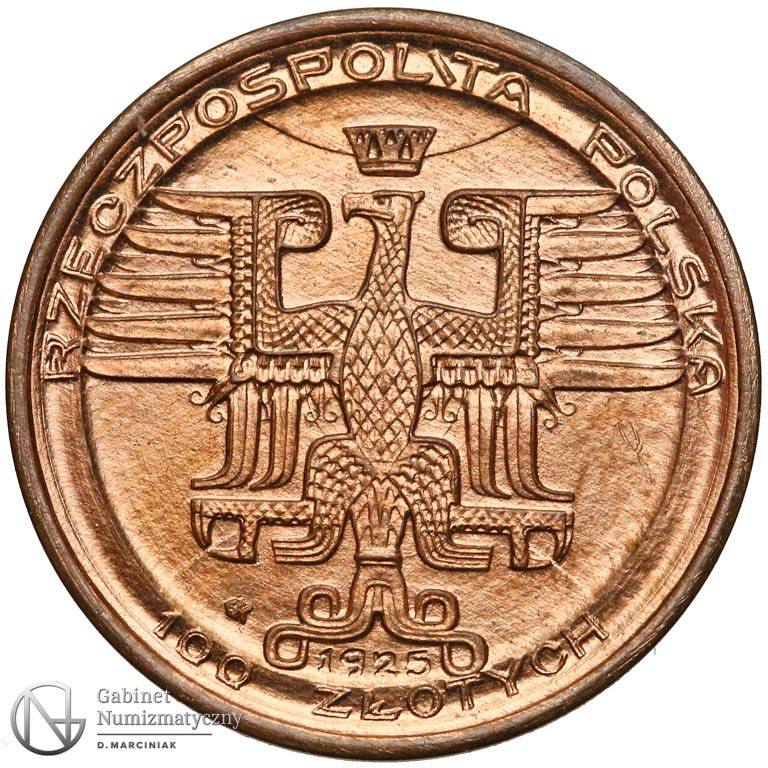
Modernist eagle from a rare coin (1925)

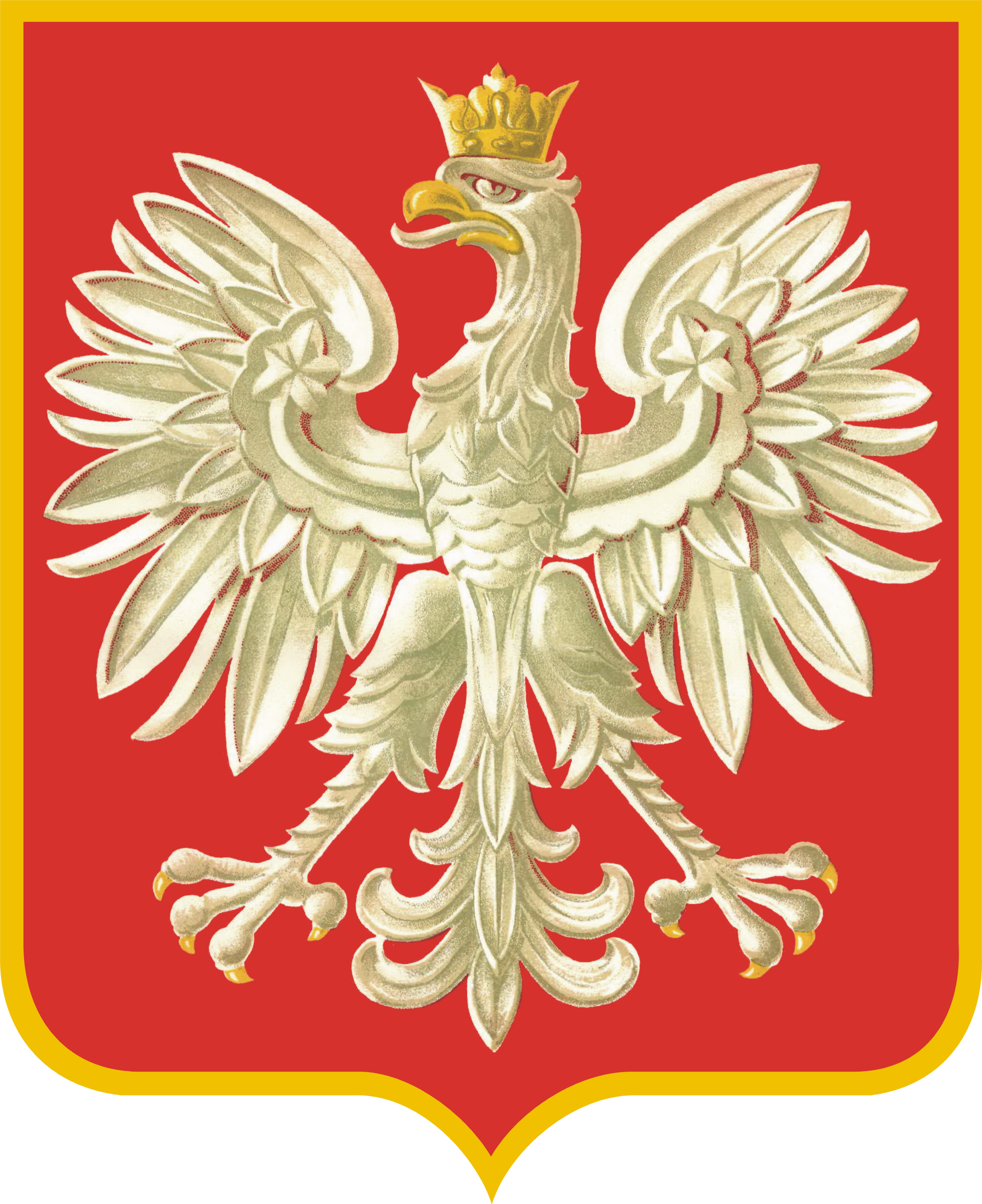
Official Polish coat of arms since 1928 according to the law

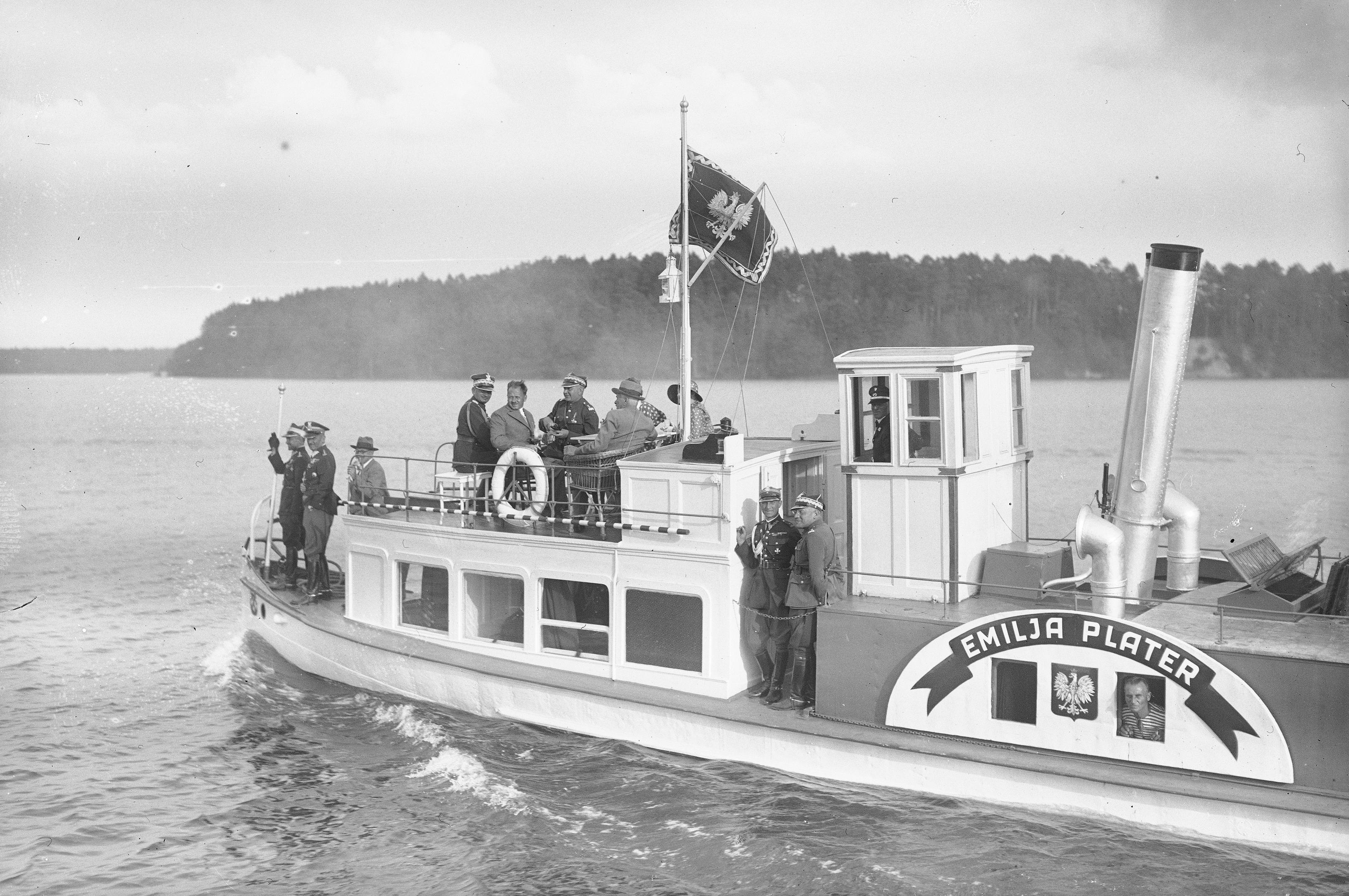
Official Polish coat of arms since 1928 according to the law, exposed by president during a steamboat cruise. Visible knight's shield, Modern French type without ordinary grey oval plate, which is rare

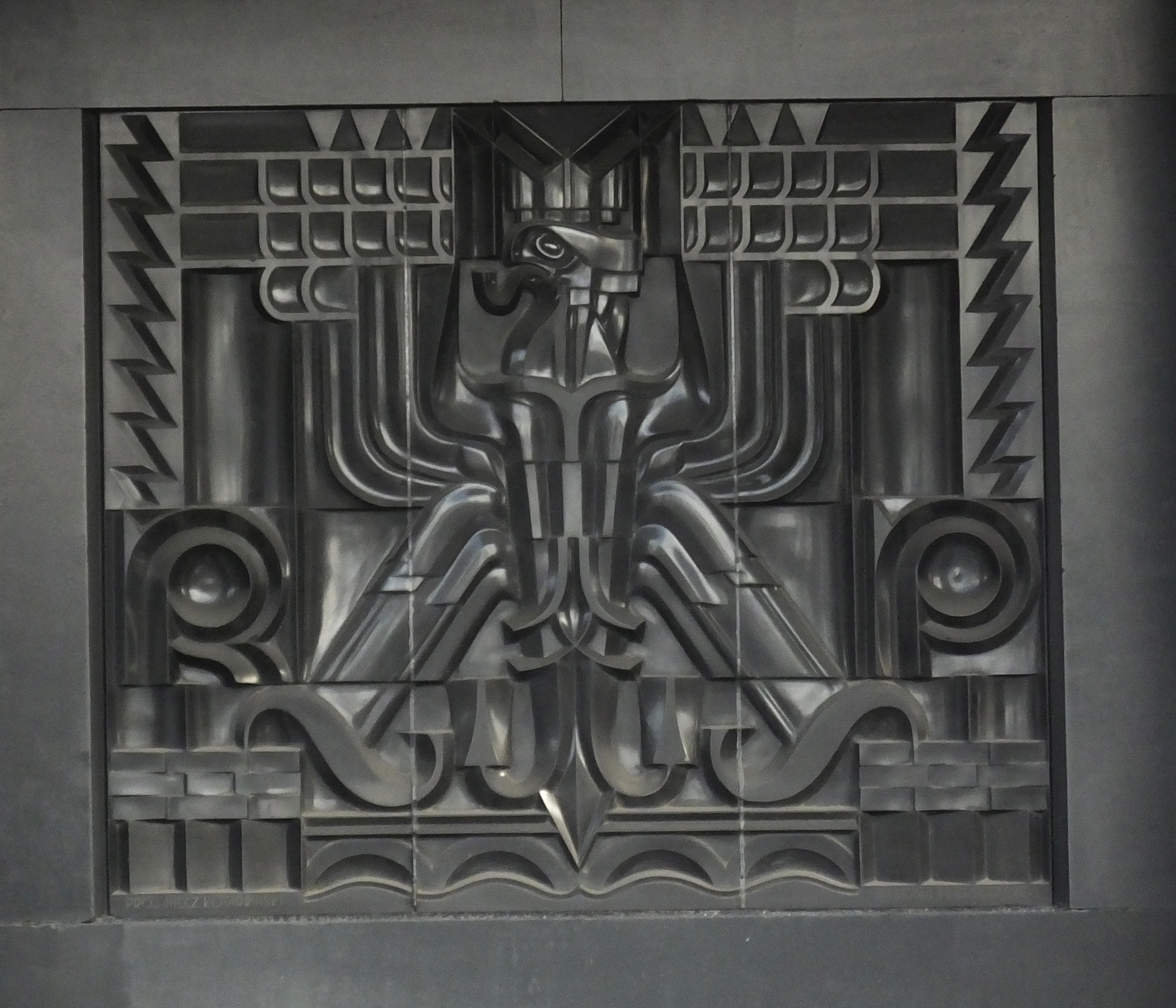
Polish coat of arms (unofficial) in Art Deco style, on the façade of the Ministry of Transport in Warsaw (architect Rudolf Świerczyński, 1931)

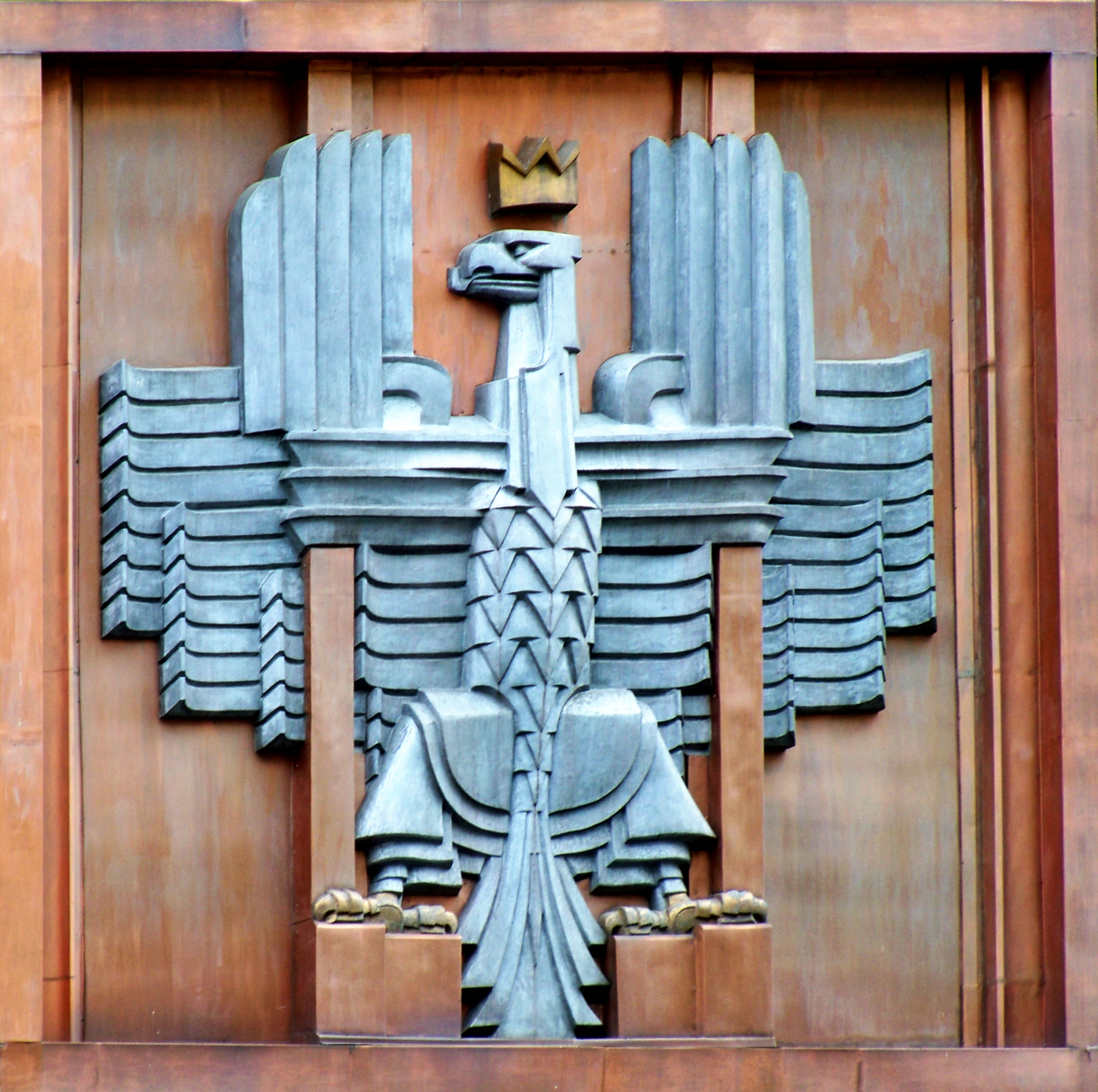
Polish coat of arms (unofficial) in Art Deco style, on the façade of the post office in Warsaw (architect Julian Puterman-Sadłowski, 1934)

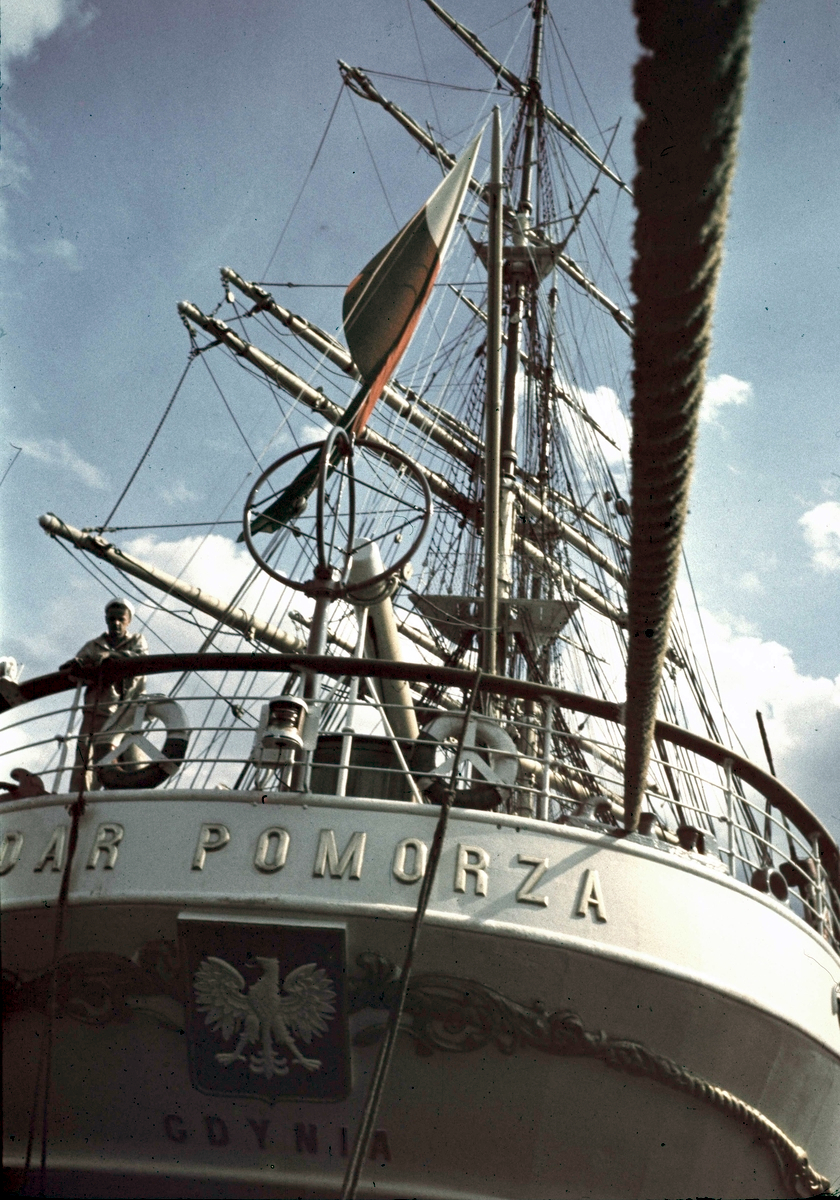
Polish coat of arms in the full-rigged sailing ship from Gdynia called "Dar Pomorza" (English: Gift of Pomerania), 1938

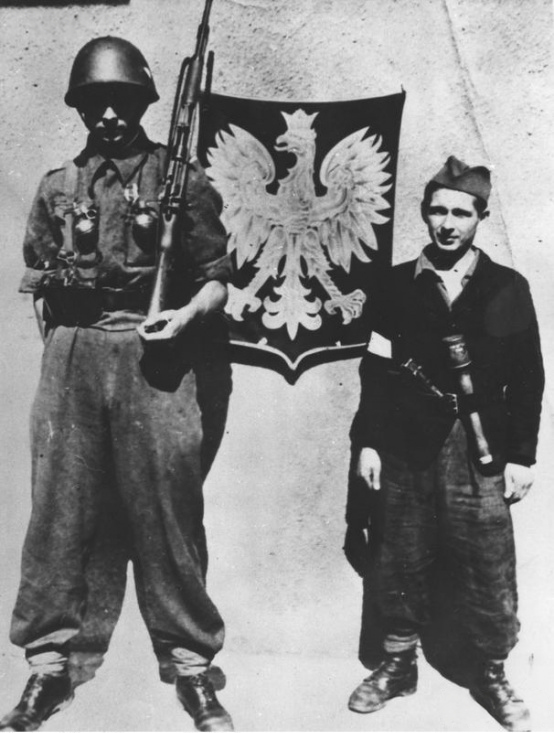
Coat of arms of Poland during the Warsaw Uprising, 1944

==== Communist Poland ====
Used since 1944 and legalized in 1952, the emblem of the Polish People's Republic was valid until February 21, 1990. In addition to the lack of a crown and other rosettes, there is a significant deformation of the eagle's head and eye compared to the pre-war eagle.

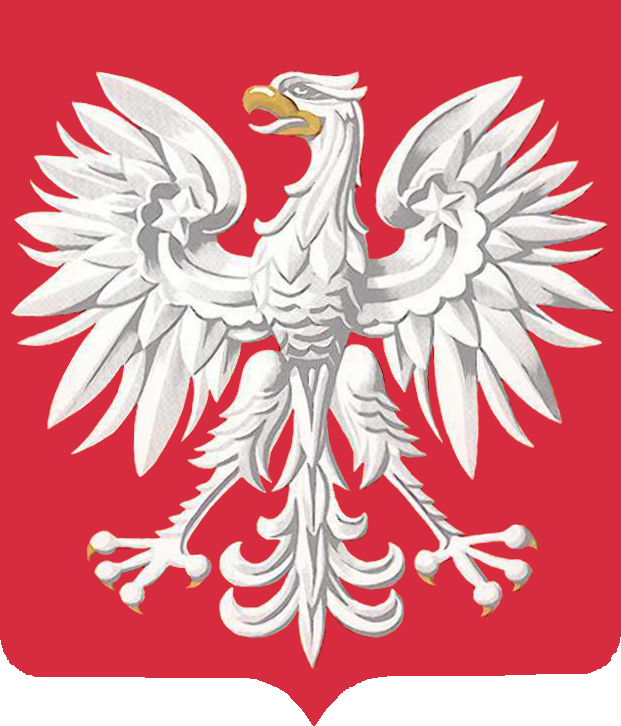
The coat of arms of the Polish People's Republic (1944–1990) according to the law.

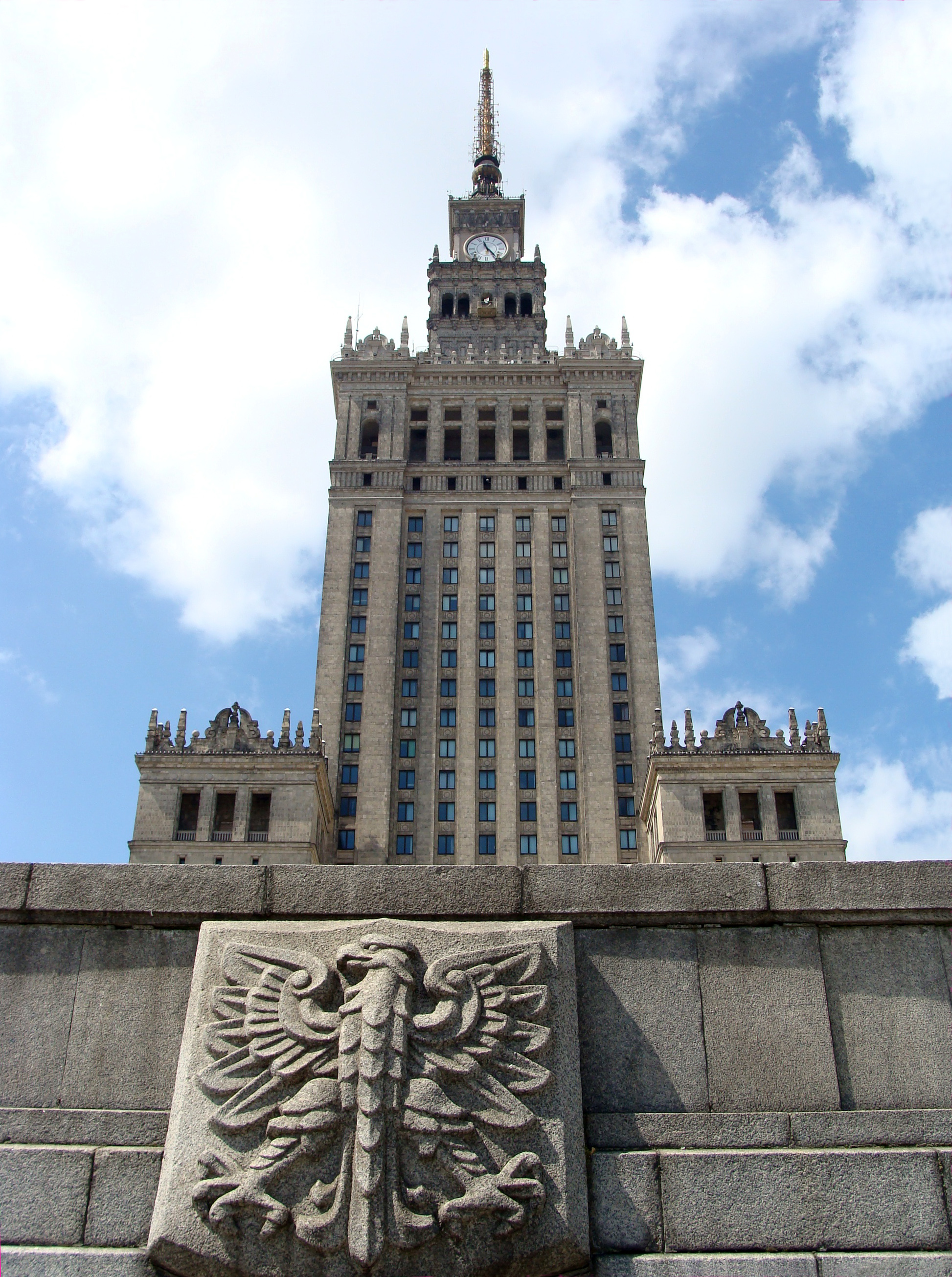
The coat of arms of the Polish People's Republic against the Palace of Culture and Science.

==== Third Polish Republic ====
The current version of the Emblem is consistent with the Act of February 22, 1990. Significant modifications by Andrzej Heidrich are visible compared to the pre-war eagle created by Zygmunt Kamiński.

Official coat of arms of the Republic of Poland (since 1990)

Same coat of arms with black outlines

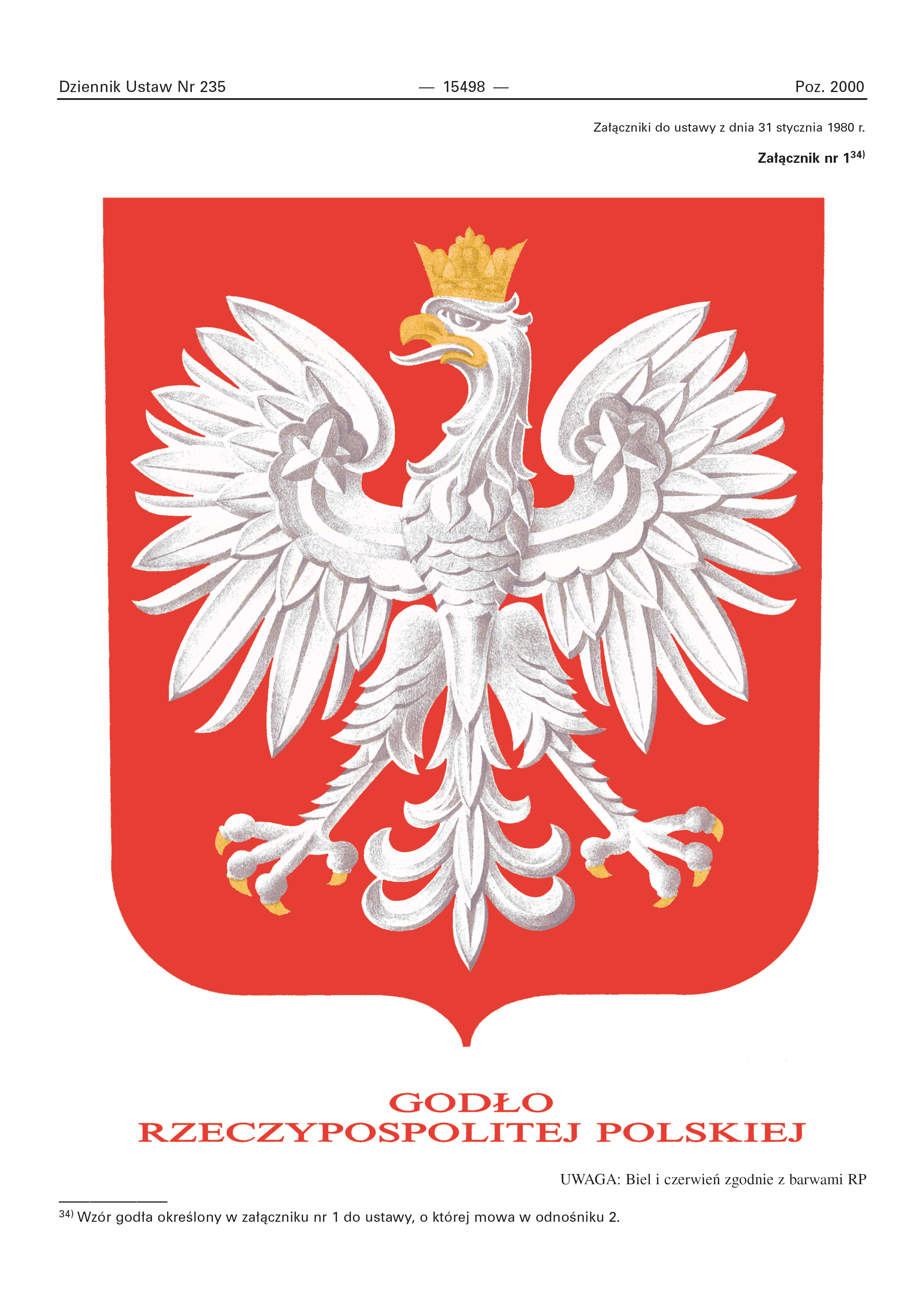
Coat of arms of the Republic of Poland according to the law Dz.U. z 2005 r. Nr 235, poz. 2000

Presidential standard

The eagle used by governmental institutions and on Polish passports

The logo of the Senate

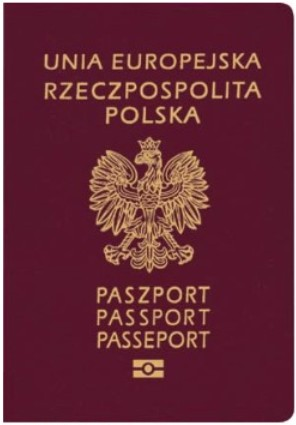
The coat of arms on a Polish passport (2006)

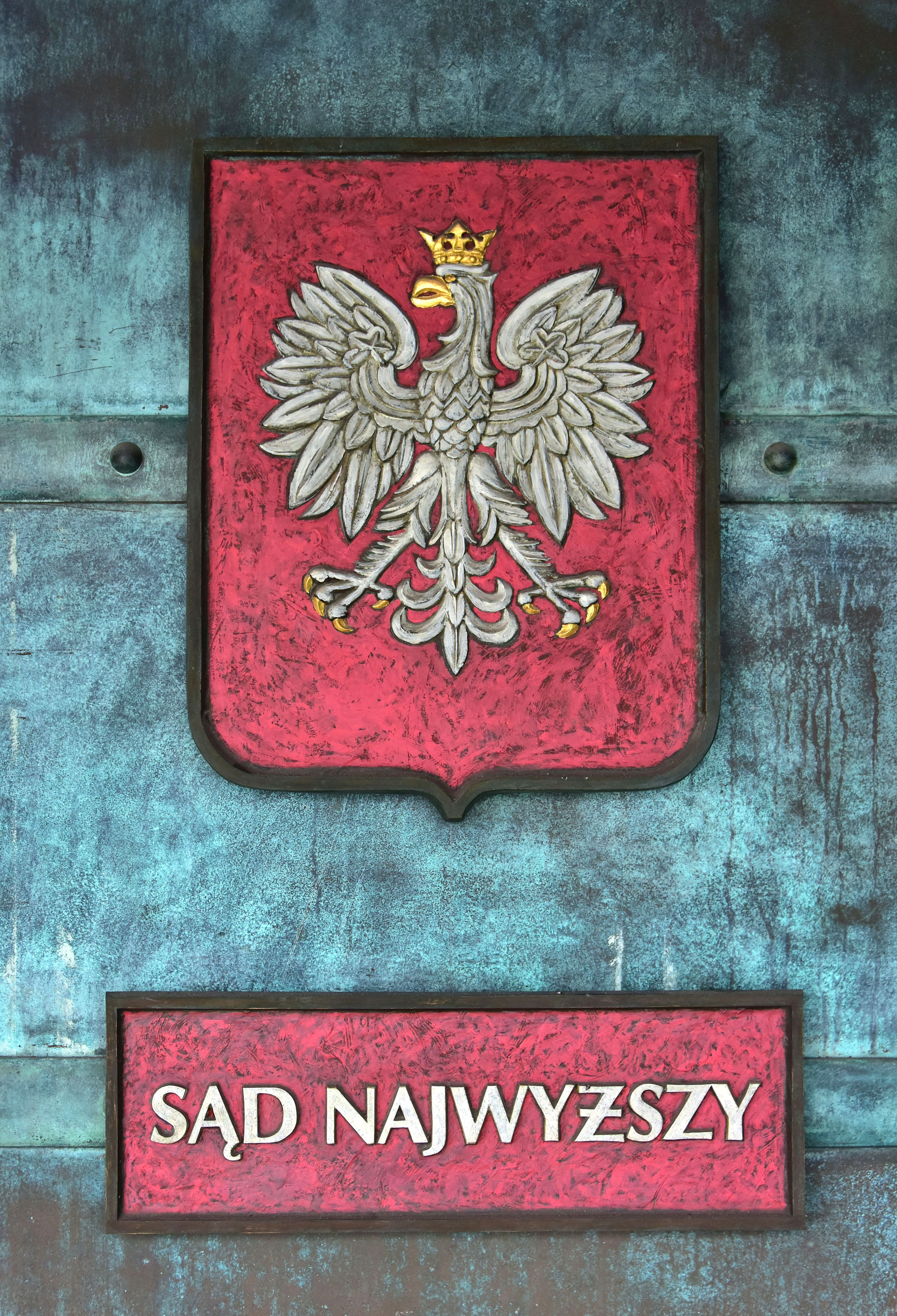
The coat of arms of Poland in the Supreme Court of Poland in Warsaw (by architect Marek Budzyński, 1992). It's a knight's shield, Modern French type in heraldry. The knight's shields without ordinary grey oval plates are rare on façades. This type of shield, without grey oval plate resembling the coat of arms in the Polish parliament in Warsaw

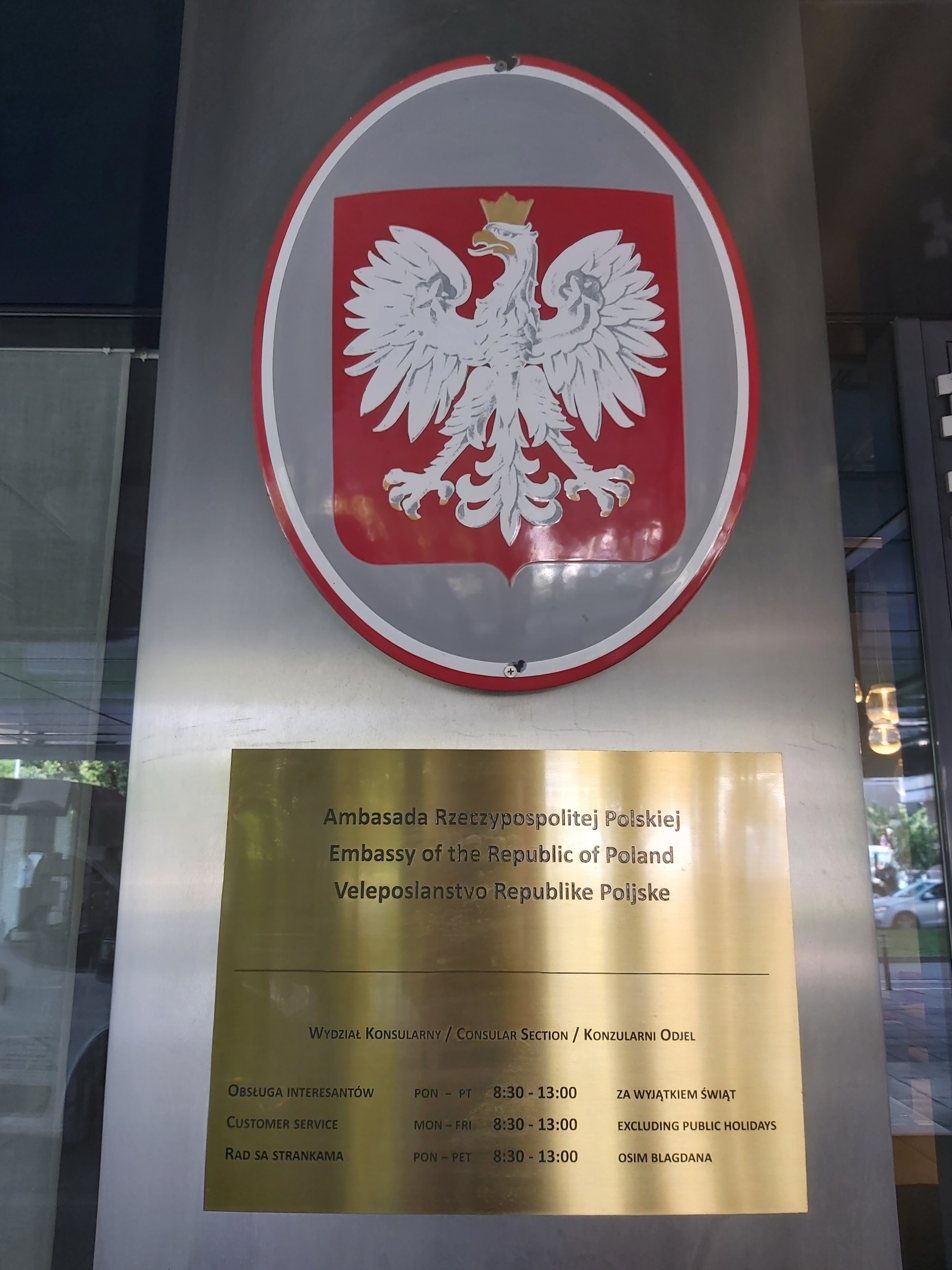
The coat of arms of Poland in Zagreb. The grey oval plate made of metal sheet is visible. The grey oval plates are popular in schools and embassies on facades, but ovals are considered as ordinary

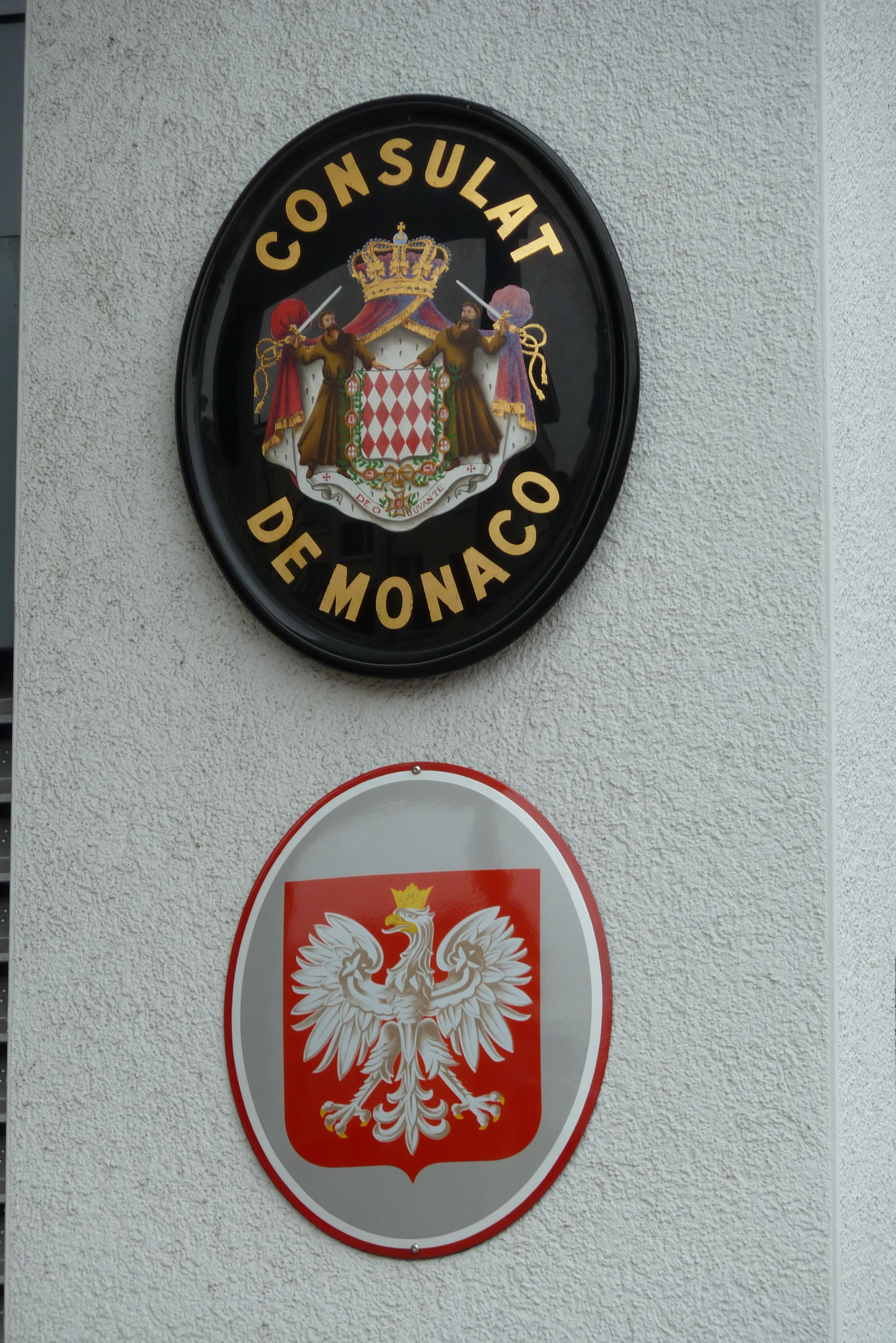
The coat of arms of Poland in Vaduz. Poland was using golden paint (like Monaco) over its metal plates till 1939; later, during the communist era, paint was changed to yellow

=== Military Eagle ===
Polish Land Forces

Polish Air Force

Polish Navy

Polish Special Forces

Territorial Defence Force

== See also ==
- Banner of Poland
- Coat of arms of Lithuania
- Coat of arms of Congress Poland
- Coat of arms of the Polish–Lithuanian Commonwealth
- List of Polish nobility coats of arms images
- Flag of Poland
- Order of the White Eagle – the highest order in Polish honours system.
- Polish coins and banknotes
- Polish military eagle
- Polish heraldry
