= Zygmunt Kamiński (painter) =

Polish painter

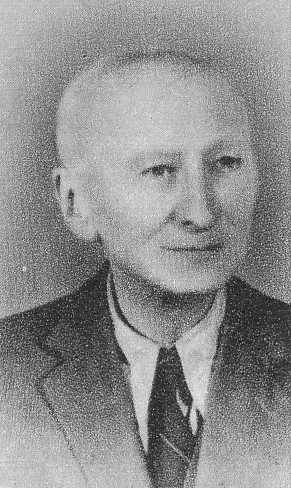
- Born: 22 November 1888; Warsaw, Poland
- Died: 12 October 1969 (aged 80); Warsaw, Poland
- Occupation: Painter

Zygmunt Kamiński (22 November 1888 – 12 October 1969) was a Polish painter and professor at the Warsaw University of Technology. His work was part of the painting event in the art competition at the 1928 Summer Olympics. He also designed the modern Coat of arms of Poland.
