= 19-złoty note =

Nineteen złotych
- Country: Poland
- Value: 19 Polish złoty
- Width: 150 mm
- Height: 77 mm
- Material used: Special paper
- Years of printing: 2019

Obverse
- Design: Portrait of Ignacy Jan Paderewski alongside a stylized image of the Order of the White Eagle.

Reverse
- Design: Image of the building of the Polish Security Printing Works against the backdrop of contemporary Warsaw skyline.

The Polish 19-złoty note is a denomination of the Polish złoty.

== History ==
=== Collector banknotes ===
The National Bank of Poland issued a collector's banknote commemorating the 100th anniversary of the establishment of the Polish Security Printing Works. The banknote was released on October 2, 2019, with a denomination of 19 złotych. There are currently 55,000 notes in circulation.

== Polska Wytwórnia Papierów Wartościowych ==
The Polish Security Printing Works (Polish: Polska Wytwórnia Papierów Wartościowych SA) (PWPW) was established on January 25, 1919, by the decision of the Council of Ministers under the leadership of Prime Minister Ignacy Jan Paderewski.

For over 100 years, the Printing Works has been a guarantor of the security of the Polish state and the identity of its citizens. PWPW manufactures highly secure banknotes, identification documents, postage stamps, and dozens of other security printing products.

Today, PWPW is one of the most modern companies in the world engaged in the production of secure paper, banknotes, and secure prints. Remaining in the service of the Polish state, the company successfully fulfills domestic orders and dynamically develops its export production.

The history of PWPW is particularly associated with the figure of its patron - Ignacy Jan Paderewski, one of the founding fathers of independent Poland, a prominent politician, pianist, and philanthropist.

The banknote presented is another one from the "Independence" series. The date on the banknote, January 25, 2019, marks the 100th anniversary of the establishment of PWPW. The nominal value of 19 złotych refers to the year of establishment of the Printing Works.
