= 10-złoty note =

Denomination note of Polish currency

Ten złotych
- Country: Poland
- Value: 10 Polish złoty
- Width: 120 mm
- Height: 60 mm
- Security features: Watermark, a security thread, microprinting, ultraviolet ink, a see-through register (recto-verso), latent image (angle effect), metallised ink.
- Material used: White Paper
- Years of printing: 1794–1831; 1924–1950; 1950–1995; 1995–present

Obverse
- Design: Portrait of Duke Mieszko I in centre area

Reverse
- Design: Depiction of a denar, a silver coin from Mieszko I's reign

The Polish 10-złoty note is the lowest value złoty banknote and has been used since the redenomination of the złoty in 1995. The note is used as the sole currency in Poland, a country with a population of about 38 million.

It is the smallest note, measuring 120×60mm with a dark brown and green colour scheme. The ten-złoty note features a portrait of Duke Mieszko I in the obverse centre area, while the reverse depicts a denar, a silver coin from Mieszko I's reign. The banknote is protected with multiple security features, like watermarks and microprinting, which document its authenticity.

The ten-złoty note has been used since 1794, along with the rest of the first złoty banknotes, although there were some temporary discontinuations in its usage.

== History ==
=== First złoty banknotes ===
In 1794, treasury notes were issued in denominations of 5 and 10 groszy, 1, 4, 5, 10, 25, 50, 100, 500 and 1000 złotych. The Duchy of Warsaw issued notes for 1, 2 and 5 talarów.

In 1824, the Bank Kassowy Królestwa Polskiego issued notes for 10, 50 and 100 złotych. The Bank Polski issued notes dated 1830 and 1831 in denominations of 1, 5, 50 and 100 złotych, whilst assignats for 200 and 500 złotych were issued during the insurrection of 1831. From 1841, the Bank Polski issued notes denominated in roubles.

=== Second złoty banknotes ===
In 1924, along with provisional notes (overprints on old, bisected notes) for 1 and 5 groszy, the Ministry of Finance issued notes for 10, 20 and 50 groszy, whilst the Bank Polski introduced 1, 2, 5, 10, 20, 50, 100, 500 and 1000 złotych. From 1925, the Ministry of Finance issued 2- and 5-złoty notes, before they were replaced by silver coins, and the Bank Polski issued 5-, 10-, 20- and 50-złoty notes, with the 100-złoty note only reintroduced in 1932. In 1936, the Bank Polski issued 2 złote notes, followed in 1938 by Ministry of Finance notes for 1 złoty.

In 1939, the General Government overprinted 100-złoty notes for use before, in 1940, the Bank Emisyjny w Polsce was set up and issued notes for 1, 2, 5, 10, 20, 50, 100 and 500 złotych. After liberation, notes (dated 1944) were introduced by the Narodowy Bank Polski for 50 grosz, 1, 2, 5, 10, 20, 50, 100 and 500 złotych, with 1000-złoty notes added in 1945.

=== Third złoty banknotes ===
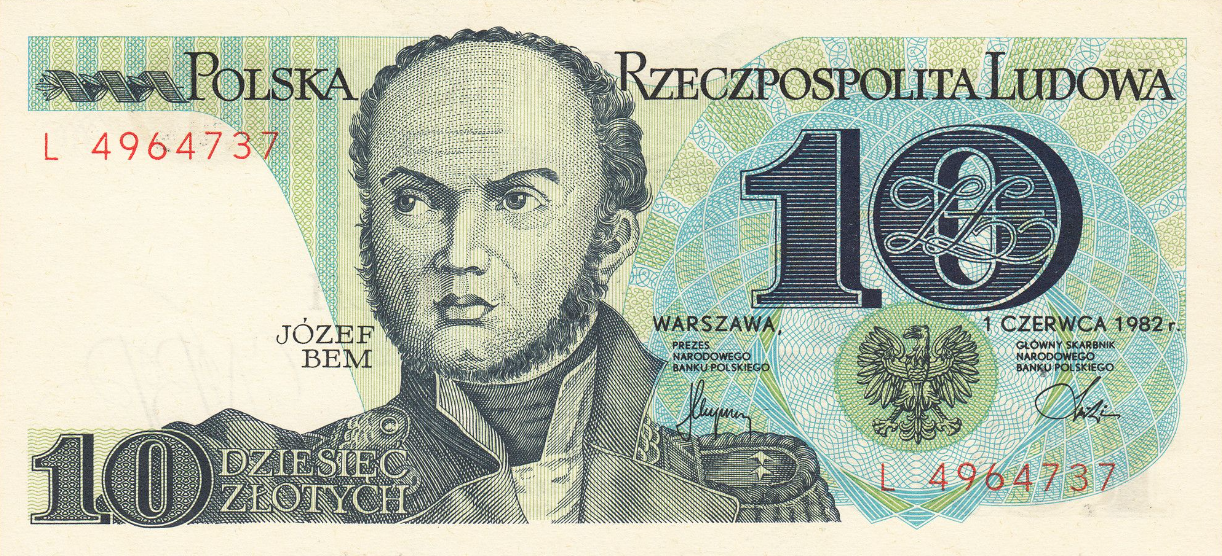
The 10-złoty note, with a picture of Józef Bem, from the third banknote series.

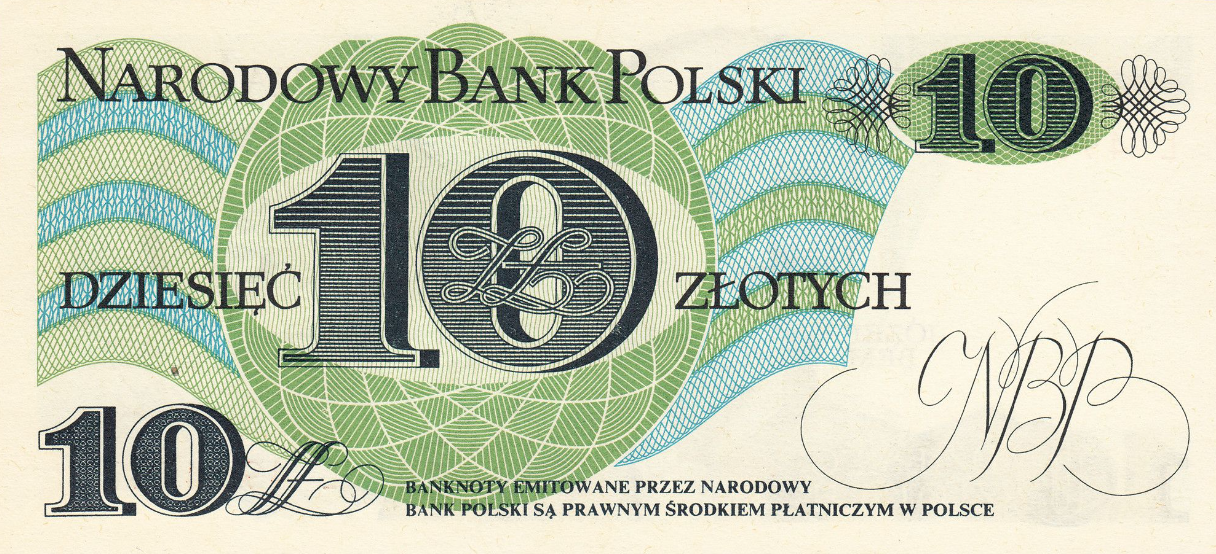
The reverse side of the 10-złoty note.

In 1950, new notes, which were dated 1948, were introduced for 2, 5, 10, 20, 50, 100 and 500 złotych, but 1000-złoty notes were added in 1962. 200- and 2000-złoty notes were added in 1976 and 1977, followed by 5000-złoty notes in 1982. The late 1980s and early 1990s saw high inflation in Poland and led to the introduction of notes in denominations of 10,000 in 1987, 20,000 in 1989, 50,000 in 1989, 100,000 in 1990, 200,000 in 1989, 500,000 in 1990, 1,000,000 in 1991 and 2,000,000 złotych in 1992. These notes (and coins) were valid, but with the exception of the 200,000-złoty note, until the end of 1996. They could be exchanged at the National Bank of Poland and some banks obligated to it by the NBP until 31 December 2010, and they are no longer legal tender.

=== Current banknotes ===
In 1995, notes, which were dated 1994, were introduced in denominations of 10 złotych, 20 złotych, 50 złotych, 100 złotych and 200 złotych.

== Collector banknotes ==
There has been only one ten-złoty collector banknote, which was issued in 2008.

=== 90th anniversary of Polish independence ===
The 90th anniversary of Polish independence 10-złoty commemorative banknote was issued in 2008.

On 30 October 2008, the National Bank of Poland issued its second collector's banknote, this time commemorating the 90th anniversary of Polish independence. 80,000 banknotes of this kind were printed.

The right side of the obverse bears a bust of Joseph Pilsudski viewed in profile. Beside the picture of Pilsudski there is a view of the Belvedere Palace, which was seat of the Chief of State in the years 1918–1922 and being the residence of the Polish Marshal from 1926 to 1935. The second image of Joseph Pilsudski, visible in the lower left corner, recalls that the most urgent challenges facing the country had a military character. The Marshal, in a military cloak and cap, is leaning on the edge of a trench and watching. Above the view of the Belvedere Palace is the emblem of the Polish state in its present form. Beside Pilsudski's picture, on the right hand side is the year '1918' in vertical writing.

The reverse features an image of the 1919 version of the Coat of arms of Poland which was used, among others, on the 1919–1923 Polish marka banknotes, the first money issued by the independent Polish state. Next to it, the Kielce monument to the deeds of the Polish Legions, called the "rifle squad four", showing figures of four legionnaires marching in formatio, is pictured.

==== Security features ====
The banknote is protected by multiple security features:

- Watermark – an image of Józef Pilsudski
- Security thread with microprinted "10 ZŁ"
- Gravure printing on the front – tactile
- Offset micro lettering and steel engraving – "Narodowy Bank Polski", "Rzeczpospolita Polska", "10", "10 ZŁ"
- Horizontal and vertical serial numbering on the reverse of the note
- Optically variable ink – on the reverse of the banknote, the denomination designation changes from mauve to green
- Recto verso print – image elements of Pilsudski, printed on both sides of the banknote, complement each other, forming a complete picture
- Sign for the blind to recognise, an "X" – tactile
- Latent individual – setting the note at the right angle, we see the year "2008"
- Ultraviolet ink – on the back of the numerals and the image of military decorations

== See also ==
- Commemorative coins of Poland
