= Coat of arms of Congress Poland =

Polish coat of arms

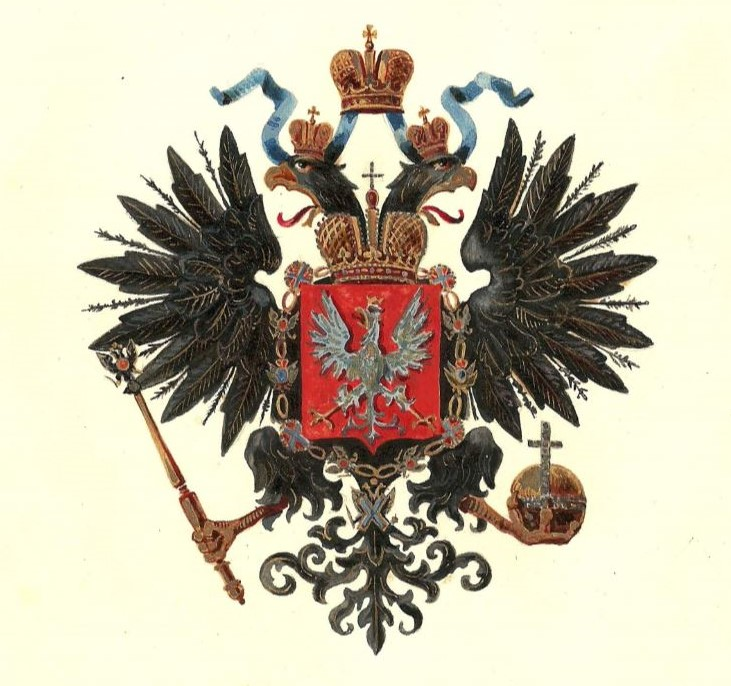
Coat of arms of Congress Poland (1858)

Coat of arms of Congress Poland was the symbol of the Congress Poland, representing the domination of the Russian Empire over the Crown of the Polish Kingdom. It combined their previously separate coats of arms:

Coat of arms of the Russian Empire, the double-headed eagle

The coat of arms was established after the creation of the Congress Poland in 1815; was modified in the years 1832, 1842 and 1858 and abolished in February 1869, as part of the process of depriving Congress Poland of autonomy and transforming into a regular province of the Russian Empire, the Privislinsky Krai.

== Coat of arms of Congress Poland in the coat of arms of the Russian Empire ==
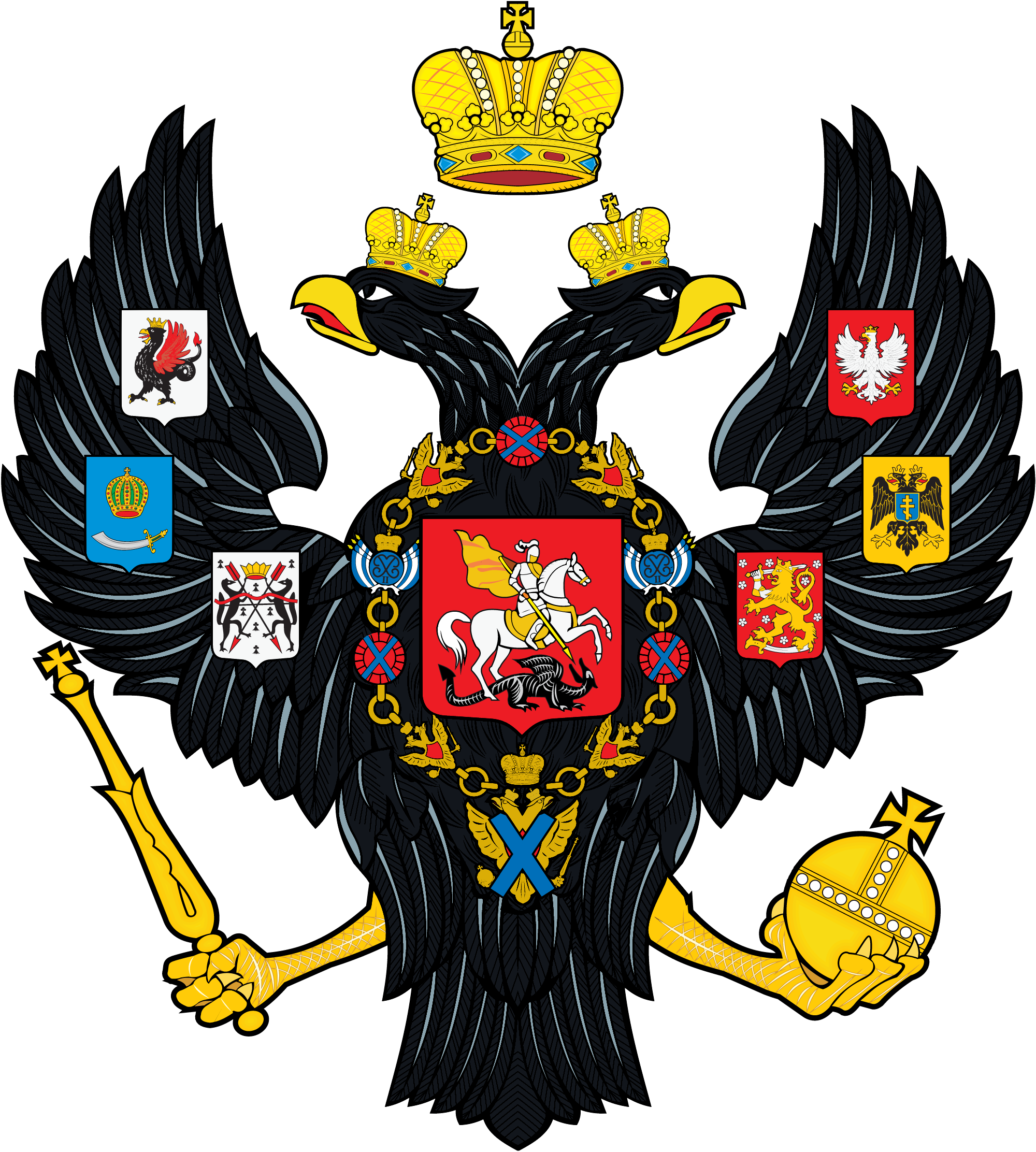
1828

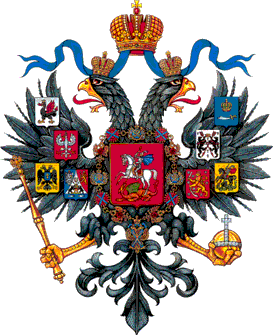
19th century

Greater coat of arms of the Russian Empire (1882)

Lesser coat of arms of the Russian Empire (1883)
