= Julian Puterman-Sadłowski =

Polish architect

- Born: October 2, 1892; Sosnowiec
- Died: March 22, 1953 (aged 60); Warsaw
- Education: Technical University of Munich
- Occupation: Architect

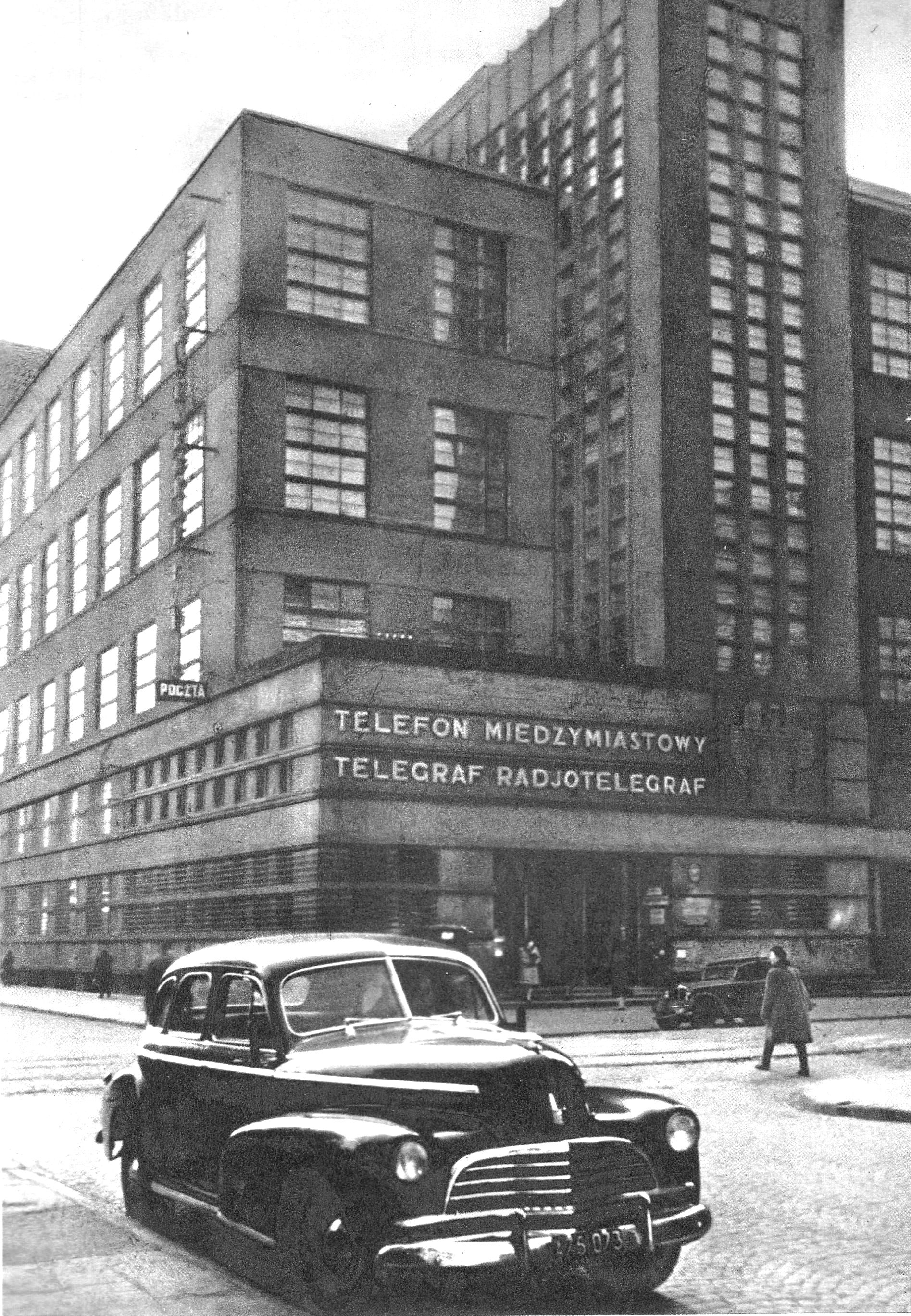
Building of the Telecommunications and Telegraph Office at Nowogrodzka Street 45 in Warsaw

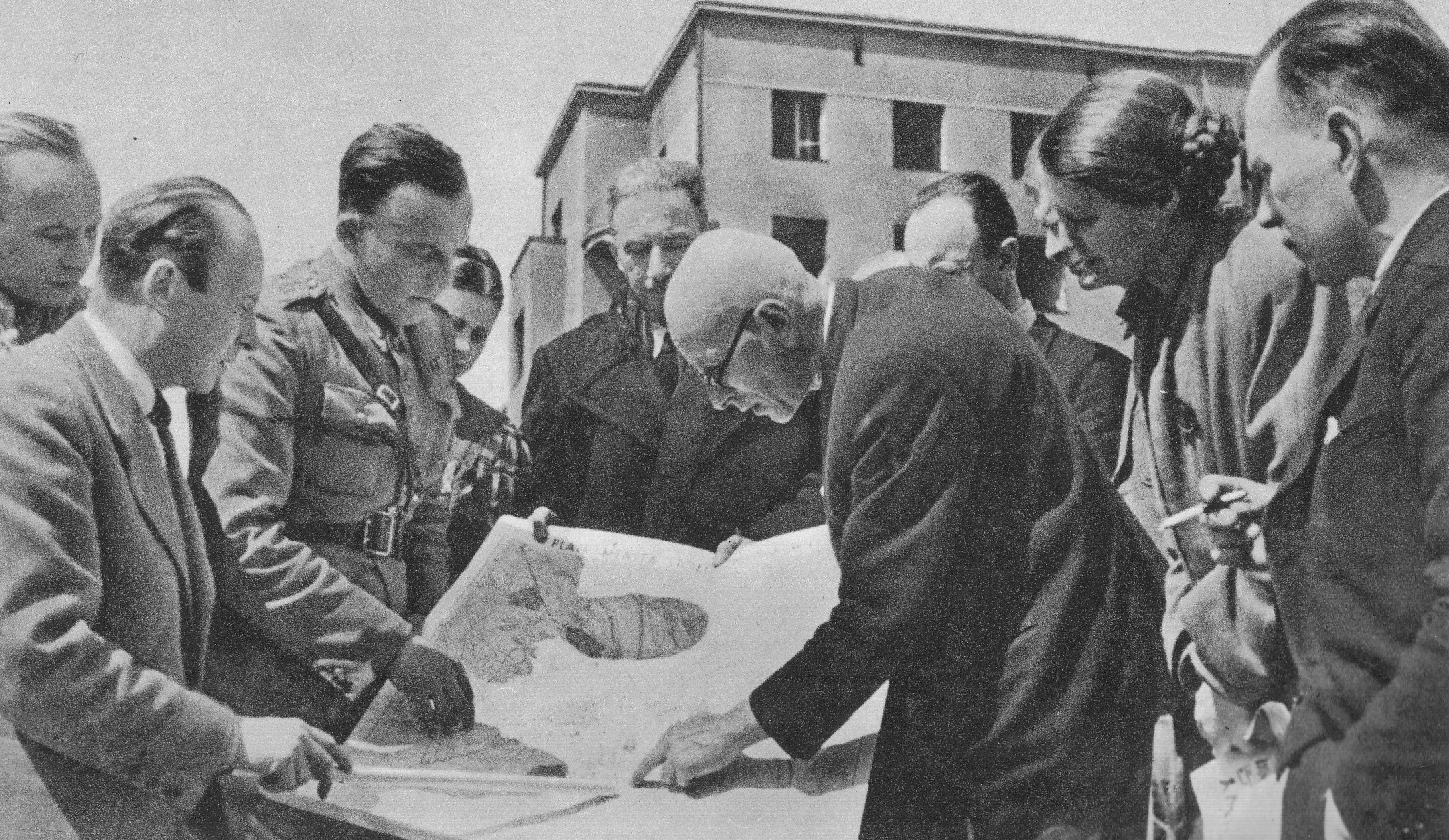
Julian Puterman-Sadłowski (third from the left) with colleagues from the Bureau of Reconstruction of the Capital (1945)

Julian Puterman-Sadłowski (until 1942 Julian Puterman; October 2, 1892 – March 22, 1953) was a Polish architect and academic lecturer.

== Biography ==
His parents were involved in medicine; his father, Jakub Puterman, was a doctor, and his mother, Anna Margulies, worked as a bacteriologist and was the heiress of a family that owned the Meyerhold Steel Industry in Sosnowiec.

After graduating from the Commercial School in Będzin, he moved to Kraków, where he completed his secondary education in 1911 at the Higher Real School. He then moved to Munich, where he began engineering studies at the Technical University of Munich. The outbreak of World War I forced him to interrupt his studies, but he resumed them in 1916 and graduated as an architect-engineer a year later. Until February 1918, he held the position of assistant at his alma mater, then returned home to become a plant architect at the Azoty Plant in Chorzów, while also apprenticing under architect Jan Rakowicz.

In 1919, he became a professor at the Higher School of Construction in Poznań. He held this position until the end of the 1925/1926 academic year, with a one-year break for military service during the Polish-Soviet War, in which he fought as a private. In 1926, he moved to Warsaw, where he opened a private architectural office.

He was a professor at the Warsaw University of Technology in the Department of Sanitary Construction. From 1928, he served as the head of the design office of the Ministry of Post and Telegraph. From 1929, he co-ran an architectural firm with sculptor Antoni Miszewski. During 1939–1940, he lived in Kaunas. From 1940–1941, he worked in Vilnius as the head of the Industrial Design Office.

In 1944, in Lublin, he participated in organizing the Ministry of Reconstruction. From 1945, he lived in Warsaw, where he worked in the Bureau of Reconstruction of the Capital (BOS) until 1947.

== Works ==
- 1922–1929 – School of the Monastery of the Sisters of Sacré Coeur in Polish Village near Pobiedziska
- 1928–1929 – Main Post Office building in Gdynia (jointly with Antoni Miszewski and Waldemar Radlow)
- 1929 – Exhibition pavilion of the Ministry of Post and Telegraph at the General National Exhibition in Poznań in 1929
- 1930 – Garage for postal vehicles at Ratuszowa Street in Warsaw (demolished in 1944)
- 1931 – Post office building in Sandomierz (jointly with Jan Najman)
- 1931–1933 – Main Post Office building in Kalisz
- 1929–1934 – Telecommunications and Telegraph Office building at Nowogrodzka Street 45 in Warsaw; the first steel-frame building in Poland (collaboration with Antoni Miszewski)
- 1935–1937 – Post office at the railway station in Bydgoszcz
- 1936 – Post office in Łuck
- 1937 – Post office in Równe
- 1937 – Residential block for employees of the Ministry of Post and Telegraph in Warsaw
- 1938 – Marine radio station Gdynia-Witomino (Kielecka Street 103)
- 1937–1938 – Postal workers' housing estate in Gdynia-Grabówek; three residential blocks with a kindergarten pavilion in one of the courtyards
- 1938–1942 – ZUS housing estate for officials and their families in Starachowice; four detached residential blocks with a garage building, completed during the
- 1939 – Project of a postal building in Vilnius (construction 1939–1940, completed in 1959 according to another project)
- 1948–1950 – Residential estate for employees of the Ministry of Public Security in Warsaw; five residential blocks at Niepodległości Avenue 143–143B and Madalińskiego Street 70/78C–D–E (jointly with Jan Klewin)
- 1947–1951 – Hospital of the Ministry of Public Security at Wołoska Street 137 in Warsaw (jointly with Leopold Kohler)
- 1951–1960 – Bielański Hospital in Warsaw (jointly with Leopold Kohler and Stanisław Roszczyk)

=== Undated works ===
- Hotel-sanatorium Excelsior in Iwonicz (jointly with Edward Madurowicz and Karol Rauch) (construction 1927–1931)
- House at św. Barbary Street No. 2/4 in Warsaw (No. 2 office building, No. 4 apartments for employees)
- Villa of Antoni Miszewski at Racławicka Street 31 in Warsaw
- Sanatorium of the Health Insurance Fund in Lwów (jointly with Madurowicz) – competition project

== Bibliography ==
- Marta Leśniakowska (2000), Architecture in Warsaw: 1918-1939, "Arkada" Art History Workshop, ISBN 978-83-908950-2-4
- Stanisław Łoza (1954), Architects and Builders in Poland, Construction and Architecture, OCLC 29390157
- Józef Piłatowicz (1993), Henryk Markiewicz (ed.), Polish Biographical Dictionary (online ed.), OCLC 2098998
