= Commemorative coins of Poland =

Republic of Poland Rzeczpospolita Polska
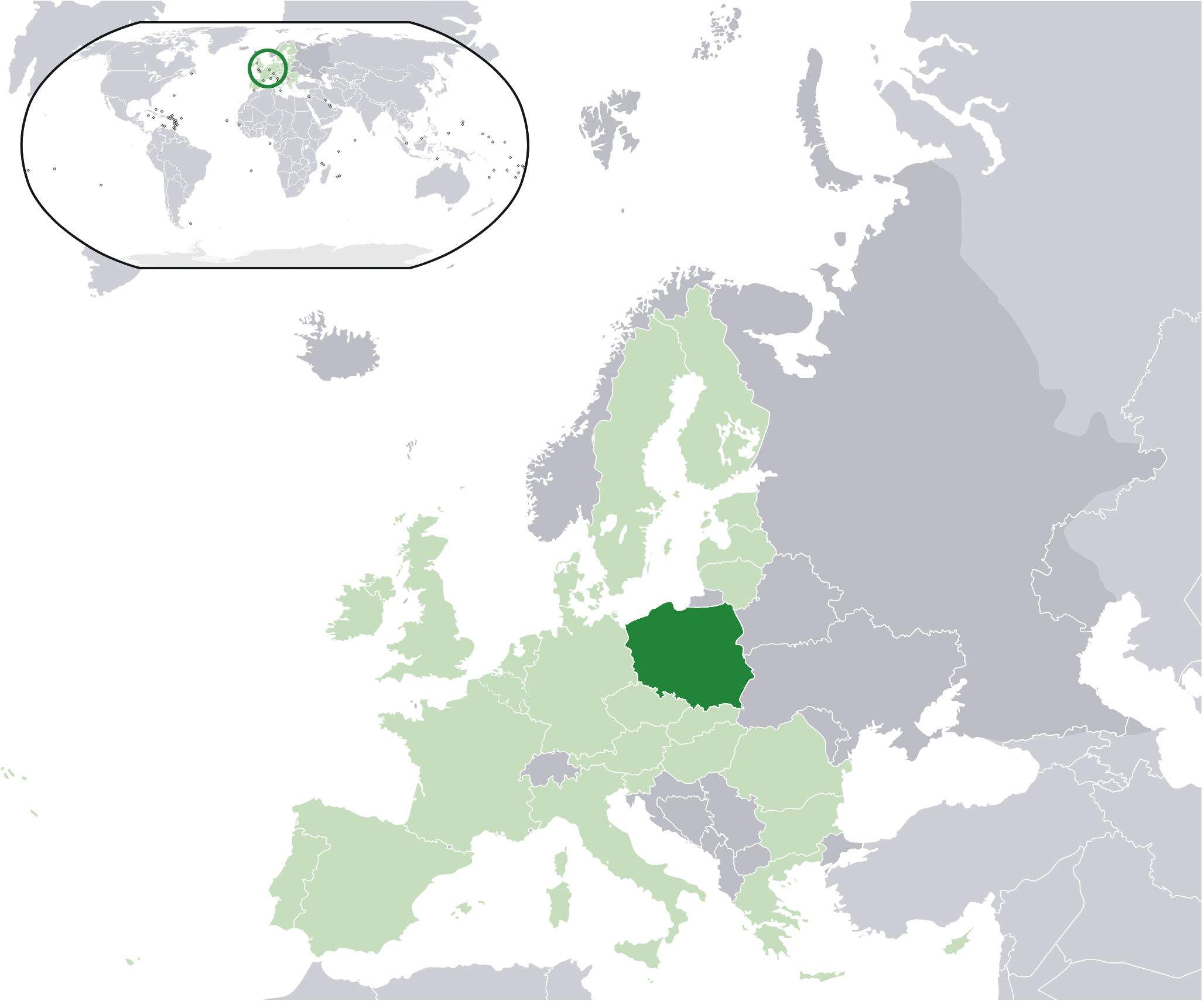
- ISO 3166 code: PL

Coin commemorating opening of the State Mint on 14 April 1924 at 18 Markowska Street, Warsaw, in presence of Polish Republic president - Stanisław Wojciechowski, and the Minister of Finance - Władyslaw Grabski.

Commemorative coins in Poland are special coins minted by the Polish Mint and issued by the National Bank of Poland (the only issuer of the Polish coins ). Each year several collector and commemorative coins are minted to mark political, historical, scientific, cultural, sporting, humanitarian and other similar events of general importance to Poland or with wider international significance. The material used for production of the commemorative coins is usually alloy of silver Ag 925, gold Au 900 or pure gold Au 999,9. Most of the commemorative coins have their equivalents in occasional coins of common use, minted from special brass called “Nordic Gold”.

The following table shows the number of coins minted per year. In the first section, the coins are grouped by the metal used, while in the second section they are grouped by their face value.

Year	Issues	By metal		By face value							
Year	Issues	Gold	Silver	200 zł	100 zł	50 zł	37 zł	30 zł	25 zł	20 zł	10 zł
2000	17	7	10	4	3	–	–	–	–	2	8
2001	16	6	10	3	3	–	–	–	–	4	6
2002	12	4	8	1	3	–	–	–	–	3	5
2003	16	6	10	2	4	–	–	–	–	4	6
2004	19	5	14	3	2	–	–	–	–	5	9
2005	22	8	14	5	3	–	–	–	–	3	11
2006	18	5	13	3	2	–	–	–	–	4	9
2007	16	5	11	4	1	–	–	–	–	3	8
2008	22	9	13	6	2	1	–	–	–	4	9
2009	24	7	17	4	1	–	1	–	1	4	13
2010	22	7	15	3	2	–	–	1	1	4	11
Coins were minted / No coins were minted / Scheduled to be minted

As a result of inflation in the early 1990s, the currency underwent redenomination. Thus, on 1 January 1995, 10 000 old złotych (PLZ) became one new złoty (PLN). The following list presents commemorative coins since Polish zloty denomination:

- Coins issued in 1995
- Coins issued in 1996
- Coins issued in 1997
- Coins issued in 1998
- Coins issued in 1999
- Coins issued in 2000
- Coins issued in 2001
- Coins issued in 2002
- Coins issued in 2003
- Coins issued in 2004
- Coins issued in 2005
- Coins issued in 2006
- Coins issued in 2007
- Coins issued in 2008
- Coins issued in 2009
- Coins issued in 2010

== See also ==
- Numismatics
- Regular issue coinage
- Coin grading

=== Articles on Polish Wikipedia ===
- pl:10 złotych wzór 1975 Adam Mickiewicz
- pl:10 złotych 1967 Karol Świerczewski
- pl:10 złotych wzór 1932 Polonia
- pl:10 złotych 1971 FAO
- pl:10 złotych 1933 Romuald Traugutt
- pl:10 złotych wzór 1932 Polonia
- pl:10 złotych 1933 Jan III Sobieski
- pl:10 złotych wzór 1934 Józef Piłsudski
- pl:10 złotych 1934 Józef Piłsudski-Orzeł Strzelecki
