= Kotowicz =

Kotowicz is a Polish-language surname of Ruthenian origin. East Slavic variants: Kotovich (Russian), Kotovych (Ukrainian), Belarusian: Kotavich (accent on the first syllable), Katovich (accent on the second syllable). Notable people with the surname include:

- Apolinary Kotowicz, Polish painter
- Grzegorz Kotowicz (born 1973), Polish canoeist
- Irene Kotowicz (1919–2002), All-American Girls Professional Baseball League player
- Robert Kotowicz, Polish commemorative coins designer (see 1, 2, 3, 4, 5)

Fictional characters:

- Janusz Kotowicz, character in the novel Ashes and Diamonds

== See also ==
- Kotowski
