= Commemorative coins of Poland: 2010 =

Commemorative coins offered by Poland in the year 2010

The following list is the scheduled issues for the year 2010. The schedule is subject to change without prior notice from the National Bank of Poland.

History of the Polish Cavalry: Chevau-légers of the Imperial Guard of Napoleon I (silver)
Coin designer: Andrzej Nowakowski		Mint: Mennica Polska S.A.	
Value: zł 10	Alloy: Ag 925/1000 (Silver)	Quantity: 100,000 pcs	Quality: Proof
Issued: 3 March 2010	Dimensions: length: 22.40 mm (0.88 in) width: 32.00 mm (1.26 in)	Weight: 14.14 g (0.50 oz; 0.45 ozt)	Market value: 100 zł
Obverse: At the top, to the left, the image of an eagle established for the national emblem of the Republic of Poland. In the center stylized images of the elements of uniforms and weaponry of the light cavalryman. At the bottom an inscription: RZECZPOSPOLITA POLSKA (REPUBLIC OF POLAND), over the eagle the mark of the issue year: 2010. Under the left foot of the eagle a symbol of the mint: M/W. Reverse: Stylized image of the light cavalryman on the horseback holding a lance. Underneath an inscription: SZWOLEŻER GWARDII CESARZA NAPOLEONA I (THE LIGHT CAVALRYMAN OF THE NAPOLEON I IMPERIAL GUARD)

== See also ==
- Numismatics
- Regular issue coinage
- Coin grading
