= Commemorative coins of Poland: 2002 =

Commemorative coins offered by Poland in the year 2002

Poland has a rich selection of gold and silver commemorative coins. In 2002 coins were launched in the series: "Polish kings and princes", "The Animals of the World", "Polish Travelers and Explorers", "Monuments of Material Culture in Poland", "Polish Painters of the Turn of 19th & 20th Centuries" and various occasional coins.

== Table of contents ==
Polish Kings and Princes: Kazimierz III the Great (1333–1370)
Coin designer: Ewa Tyc-Karpińska		Mint: Mennica Polska S.A.	
Value: zł 100	Alloy: Au 900/1000 (Gold)	Quantity: 2,400 pcs	Quality: Proof
Issued: 6 February 2002	Diameter: 21.00 mm (0.83 in)	Weight: 8.00 g (0.28 oz; 0.26 ozt)	Market value: 3.500zł
Obverse: An image of the Eagle as the state Emblem of the Republic of Poland, on the Eagle's sides, a notation of the year of issue: 2002, an inscription under the Eagle: ZŁ 100 ZŁ, in the rim, an inscription: RZECZPOSPOLITA POLSKA. Under the left talon of the Eagle the Mint mark: m/w. Reverse:The bust of Kazimierz III Wielki. On the left side, an inscription: KAZIMIERZ III WIELKI, on the right, dates: 1333- 1370 (Casimir III the Great)
Animals of the World: Pond Turtle – Emys orbicularis
Obverse designer: Ewa Tyc-Karpińska, Reverse designer: Andrzej Nowakowski		Mint: Mennica Polska S.A.	
Value: zł 20	Alloy: Ag 925/1000 (Silver)	Quantity: 35,000 pcs	Quality: Proof
Issued: 6 February 2002	Diameter: 38.61 mm (1.52 in)	Weight: 28.28 g (1.00 oz; 0.91 ozt)	Market value: 600 zł
Obverse: An image of the Eagle as the State Emblem of the Republic of Poland. Under the Eagle a notation of the year of issue: 2002, below an inscription: ZŁ 20 ZŁ. On both sides of the Eagle's talon, an image of the State flag. Upwards a semicircular inscription: RZECZPOSPOLITA POLSKA. Under the left talon of the Eagle, the Mint mark: m/w. Reverse:The images of two swimming pond turtles. Both on the left and on the right, stylized weed. Upwards a semicircular inscription: ŻÓŁW BŁOTNY – Emys orbicularis (European pond terrapin).
Polish Travellers and Explorers: Bronisław Malinowski (1884–1942)
Coin designer: Ewa Tyc-Karpińska		Mint: Mennica Polska S.A.	
Value: zł 10	Alloy: Ag 925/1000 (Silver)	Quantity: 33,500 pcs	Quality: Proof
Issued: 6 March 2002	Diameter: 32.00 mm (1.26 in)	Weight: 14.14 g (0.50 oz; 0.45 ozt)	Market value: 100 zł
Obverse: An image of Bronisław Malinowski. Below an inscription: Bronisław / Malinowski / 1884–1942. On the right side an image of the Eagle as the State Emblem of the Republic of Poland. Under the Eagle a notation of the year of issue: 2002, below an inscription: 10 ZŁ. Above a semicircular inscription: RZECZPOSPOLITA POLSKA. Under the left talon of the Eagle, the Mint mark: m/w. Reverse: A scene presenting the inhabitants of the Trobriand Islands in front of a granary. On the edge: an inscription: ETNOLOG,ANTROPOLOG KULTURY (ethnologist, anthropologist of culture) divided by a star.
Polish Kings and Princes: Władysław II Jagiełło (1386–1434)
Obverse designer: Ewa Tyc-Karpińska, Reverse designer: Anna Wątróbska-Wdowiarska		Mint: Mennica Polska S.A.	
Value: zł 100	Alloy: Au 900/1000 (Gold)	Quantity: 2,200 pcs	Quality: Proof
Issued: 17 April 2002	Diameter: 21.00 mm (0.83 in)	Weight: 8.00 g (0.28 oz; 0.26 ozt)	Market value: 3.500zł
Obverse: An image of the Eagle as the state Emblem of the Republic of Poland, on the Eagle's sides a notation of the year of issue: 2002, an inscription under the Eagle: ZŁ 100 ZŁ, in the rim, an inscription: RZECZPOSPOLITA POLSKA. Under the left talon of the Eagle the Mint mark: m/w. Reverse: The bust of king Władysław II Jagiełło. Around an inscription WŁADYSŁAW II JAGIEŁŁO, below, on the right, dates: 1386 / 1434.
2002 World Football Cup Korea/Japan (gold)
Coin designer: Robert Kotowicz		Mint: Mennica Polska S.A.	
Value: zł 100	Alloy: Au 900/1000 (Gold)	Quantity: 4,500 pcs	Quality: Proof
Issued: 8 May 2002	Diameter: 21.00 mm (0.83 in)	Weight: 8.00 g (0.28 oz; 0.26 ozt)	Market value: 900zł
Obverse: An image of an Eagle as the State Emblem of the Republic of Poland, against a background of: a stylised fragment of a world map and a stylised ball. On both sides of the Eagle, a notation of the year of issue: 2002, under the Eagle an inscription: ZŁ 100 ZŁ, at the top a semicircular inscription: RZECZPOSPOLITA POLSKA. Under the left talon of the Eagle, the Mint mark: m/w. Reverse: An image of a football player. On the right side, an inscription: KOREA / JAPONIA / 2002. At the top, a semicircular inscription: MISTRZOSTWA ŚWIATA W PIŁCE NOŻNEJ (World Football Championship).
2002 World Football Cup Korea/Japan (silver with amber)
Coin designer: Robert Kotowicz		Mint: Mennica Polska S.A.	
Value: zł 10	Alloy: Ag 900/1000 (Silver)	Quantity: 65,000 pcs	Quality: Proof
Issued: 8 May 2002	Diameter: 32.00 mm (1.26 in)	Weight: 14.14 g (0.50 oz; 0.45 ozt)	Market value: 250 zł
Obverse: On the right side, an image of an Eagle as the State Emblem of the Republic of Poland. Below obliquely, the year of issue: 2002. On the left side, a stylized fragment of a goal and a stylised ball made of amber. Below on the left side, an inscription: 10 / ZŁ. At the top a semicircular inscription: RZECZPOSPOLITA POLSKA. Under the left talon of the Eagle, the Mint mark: m/w. Reverse: An image of two football players and: a stylised ball made of amber and a stylised fragment of a world map. At the top, a semicircular inscription: MISTRZOSTWA ŚWIATA W PIŁCE NOŻNEJ (World Football Championship), below an inscription: 2002, at the bottom an inscription: KOREA / JAPONIA
2002 World Football Cup Korea/Japan (silver)
Coin designer: Robert Kotowicz		Mint: Mennica Polska S.A.	
Value: zł 10	Alloy: Ag 900/1000 (Silver)	Quantity: 55,000 pcs	Quality: Proof
Issued: 8 May 2002	Diameter: 32.00 mm (1.26 in)	Weight: 14.14 g (0.50 oz; 0.45 ozt)	Market value: 10zł
Obverse: An image of an Eagle as the State Emblem of the Republic of Poland, against the background of stylised fragments: of a world map and a ball. Above, a semicircular inscription: RZECZPOSPOLITA POLSKA. Below on the left side, an inscription: 10 ZŁ, on the right side, the year of issue: 2002. Under the left talon of the Eagle, the Mint mark: m/w. Reverse: An image of a football player against a light-board, along with an image of two football players, a stylised world map, and an inscription: 2002 / KOREA / JAPONIA. At the bottom, a semicircular inscription: MISTRZOSTWA ŚWIATA W PIŁCE NOŻNEJ (World Football Championship).
John Paul II – Pontifex Maximus (gold)
Coin designer: Ewa Tyc-Karpińska		Mint: Mennica Polska S.A.	
Value: zł 200	Alloy: Au 900/1000 (Gold)	Quantity: 5,000 pcs	Quality: Proof
Issued: 27 May 2002	Diameter: 27.00 mm (1.06 in)	Weight: 15.50 g (0.55 oz; 0.50 ozt)	Market value: 4.500zł
Obverse: A bust of John Paul II and facsimile of his signature. On the left side an image of an Eagle as the State Emblem of the Republic of Poland. Above in a semicircle an inscription: RZECZPOSPOLITA POLSKA 2002 * 200 ZŁ. Below in a semicircle an inscription: JAN PAWEü II. Under the left talon of the Eagle, the Mint mark: m/w. Reverse: A figure of Pope John Paul II seen in the background against the stylised Holy Gate of St. Peter's Basilica in Rome. Above in a semicircle an inscription: PONTIFEX MAXIMUS.
John Paul II – Pontifex Maximus (silver)
Coin designer: Ewa Tyc-Karpińska		Mint: Mennica Polska S.A.	
Value: zł 10	Alloy: Ag 900/1000 (Silver)	Quantity: 80,000 pcs	Quality: Proof
Issued: 27 May 2002	Diameter: 32.00 mm (1.26 in)	Weight: 14.14 g (0.50 oz; 0.45 ozt)	Market value: 110 zł
Obverse:A half-figure of Pope John Paul II. On the left side an image of an Eagle as the State Emblem of the Republic of Poland. In the background a figure of Pope John Paul II. Above in a semicircle an inscription: RZECZPOSPOLITA POLSKA 2002* 10 ZŁ. Below in a semicircle an inscription: JAN PAWEŁ II. Under the left talon of the Eagle, the Mint mark: m/w. Reverse: A figure of Pope John Paul II seen in the background against the stylised Holy Gate of St. Peter's Basilica in Rome. Above in a semicircle an inscription: PONTIFEX MAXIMUS.
Polish Kings and Princes: August II the Strong (1697–1706, 1709–1733)
Coin designer: Ewa Tyc-Karpińska		Mint: Mennica Polska S.A.	
Value: zł 10	Alloy: Ag 900/1000 (Silver)	Quantity: 30,000 pcs	Quality: Proof
Issued: 4 September 2002	Diameter: 32.00 mm (1.26 in)	Weight: 14.14 g (0.50 oz; 0.45 ozt)	Market value: 150 zł
Obverse: An image of the Eagle as the state Emblem of the Republic of Poland, on the Eagle's sides a notation of the year of issue: 2002, an inscription under the Eagle: ZŁ 10 ZŁ, in the rim, an inscription: RZECZPOSPOLITA POLSKA preceded and tipped with five pearls. Under the left talon of the Eagle the Mint mark: m/w. Reverse: The bust of king August II the Strong. On the left side a distinction of Order of White Eagle. At the top in a semicircle an inscription: AUGUST II MOCNY. Below in a semicircle dates: 1697–1706; 1709–1733.
Monuments of Material Culture in Poland: Castle in Malbork
Coin designer: Roussanka Nowakowska		Mint: Mennica Polska S.A.	
Value: zł 20	Alloy: Ag 925/1000 (Silver) and ceramics	Quantity: 51,000 pcs	Quality: Proof
Issued: 23 October 2002	Diameter: 38.61 mm (1.52 in)	Weight: 28.28 g (1.00 oz; 0.91 ozt)	Market value: 400 zł
Obverse: An image of the Eagle as the State Emblem of the Republic of Poland against a background of Malbork Castle panorama. On the Eagle's left side a notation of the year of issue: 2002. On the right side an inscription: 20 / ZŁ. Above a semicircular inscription: RZECZPOSPOLITA POLSKA. Under the left talon of the Eagle, the Mint mark: m/w. Reverse: An image of Malbork Castle from the river's side. Against its background a medieval portal of St. Ann's chapel, executed in ceramics. Above a semicircular inscription: ZAMEK W MALBORKU (Castle of Malbork).
General Władysław Anders (1892–1970)
Coin designer: Andrzej Nowakowski		Mint: Mennica Polska S.A.	
Value: zł 10	Alloy: Ag 900/1000 (Silver) and paints: red, green, black	Quantity: 40,000 pcs	Quality: Proof
Issued: 6 November 2002	Diameter: 32.00 mm (1.26 in)	Weight: 14.14 g (0.50 oz; 0.45 ozt)	Market value: 200 zł
Obverse: On the left side, an image of the Eagle as the state Emblem of the Republic of Poland, below an inscription: 10 ZŁ. On the right, the year of issue: 2002 and the badge of the Monte Cassino Memorial Cross. Below, poppy flowers printed in red, green, and black. Above a semicircular inscription: RZECZPOSPOLITA POLSKA (the Republic of Poland). Under the left talon of the Eagle, the Mint mark: m/w. Reverse: On the left side, an image of General Władysław Anders. On the right, the ruins of the Monte Cassino monastery, above an inscription: /GENERAŁ/ BRONI/ WŁADYSŁAW/ ANDERS/ 1892-1970 (General Władysław Anders 1892–1970).
Polish Painters of the Turn of 19th & 20th Centuries: Jan Matejko (1838–1893)
Coin designer: Ewa Tyc-Karpińska		Mint: Mennica Polska S.A.	
Value: zł 20	Alloy: 925/1000 Ag (Silver) and paints: red, yellow, green and blue	Quantity: 57,000 pcs	Quality: Proof
Issued: 11 December 2002	Dimensions: length: 40.00 mm (1.57 in) width: 28.00 mm (1.10 in)	Weight: 28.28 g (1.00 oz; 0.91 ozt)	Market value: 300 zł
Obverse: Stylised image of Jan Matejko's picture "Stańczyk" ("Stańczyk during a ball at the queen Bona's court after having heard about the loss of Smoleńsk"). In the right angle below an image of the Eagle as the state Emblem of the Republic of Poland. Around the Eagle, an inscription: RZECZPOSPOLITA POLSKA and 20 zł. Under the left talon of the Eagle, the Mint mark: m/w. Reverse: On the left side Jan Matejko's self-portrait, below an inscription: JAN MATEJKO / 1838–1893. On the right side a fragment of stylised sketch to Jan Matejko's picture "Stańczyk". In the right angle below a palette and three paintbrushes. On the palette the following paints: red, yellow, green and blue.

== See also ==
- Numismatics
- Regular issue coinage
- Coin grading
