= Commemorative coins of Poland: 2004 =

Commemorative coins offered by Poland in the year 2004

Poland has a rich selection of Gold and Silver commemorative coins. In the year 2004 coins were launched in the series: "Animals of the World", "Polish Kings and Princes", "Polish Travelers and Explorer", "The Polish Calendar of Traditional Customs and Rituals" and "Polish Painters of the Turn of 19th and 20th Centuries" and various occasional coins.

| Animals of the World: Porpoise - Phocoena phocoena | | | |
| Obverse designer: Ewa Tyc-Karpinska; Reverse designer: Urszula Walerzak | | Mint: Mennica Polska S.A. | |
| Value: zl 20 | Alloy: Ag 925/1000 (Silver) | Quantity: 56,000 pcs | Quality: Proof |
| Issued: 28 January 2004 | Diameter: 38.61 mm (1.52 in) | Weight: 28.28 g (1.00 oz; 0.91 ozt) | Market value: |
Obverse: Image of the Eagle, established as the state emblem of the Republic of Poland; the notation of the year of issue: 2004 under the Eagle, an inscription: ZŁ 20 ZŁ below. Images of the national flag of Poland on both sides of the Eagle's talons, and circumscription: RZECZPOSPOLITA POLSKA above. The Mint mark: m/w under the Eagle's left talon. Reverse: Image of two porpoises, with a circumscription: MORŚWIN (porpoise), above. The inscription: Phocoena phocoena, below, against a background of part of the ornamental map of Poland.

== See also ==
- Numismatics
- Regular issue coinage
- Coin grading
