= Commemorative coins of Poland: 1999 =

Commemorative coins offered by Poland in the year 1999

Poland has a rich selection of Gold and Silver commemorative coins. In the year 1999 coins were launched in the series: "Polish Travelers and Explorers", "Animals of the World", "Polish kings and princes", "Castles and palaces of Poland" and various occasional coins.

== Table of contents ==
Polish Travelers and Explorers: Centenary of the death of Ernest Malinowski (1818–1899)
| Coin designer: Ewa Tyc-Karpińska | | Mint: Mennica Polska S.A. | |
| Value: zł 10 | Alloy: Ag 925/1000 (Silver) | Quantity: 18,000 pcs | Quality: Proof |
| Issued: 23 February 1999 | Diameter: 32.00 mm (1.26 in) | Weight: 14.14 g (0.50 oz; 0.45 ozt) | Market value: 250 zł |
Obverse: A stylised globe with the outline of North and South America showing the location of Peru. On the right an image of the Eagle as the State Emblem of the Republic of Poland. A semicircular inscription above: RZECZPOSPOLITA POLSKA. Below, between two parallel lines, the legend: 10 ZŁ. Under it, the date of issue: 1999. Under the left talon of the Eagle the Mint mark: m/w. Reverse: The bust of Ernest Malinowski. In the background a stylised image of a train, bridges and a mountain ravine. Above it, against the background of stylised mountains and bridges, an inscription: 4818 m n.p.m. A semicircular inscription below: 1818-1899/ERNEST MALINOWSKI. On the side an inscription: 100-LECIE SMIERCI repeated twice and separated by stars.
150th anniversary of Juliusz Słowacki's death (gold)
| Coin designer: Ewa Tyc-Karpińska | | Mint: Mennica Polska S.A. | |
| Value: zł 200 | Alloy: Au 900/1000 (Gold) | Quantity: 1,900 pcs | Quality: Proof |
| Issued: 24 March 1999 | Diameter: 27.00 mm (1.06 in) | Weight: 15.50 g (0.55 oz; 0.50 ozt) | Market value: 5000 zł |
Obverse: In the center, an image of the eagle as the State Emblem of the Republic of Poland. On the left side of the emblem, a semicircular inscription: RZECZPOSPOLITA POLSKA. On the right bottom side, a stylized feather, and a semicircular legend: 200 ZŁ 1999. Under the left talon of the Eagle the Mint mark: m/w. Reverse: Left profile of Juliusz Słowacki. A semicircular inscription: JULIUSZ / SŁOWACKI / 1809–1849. On the side an inscription: 150 ROCZNICA ŚMIERCI repeated twice and separated with stars.
150th anniversary of Juliusz Słowacki's death
| Coin designer: Ewa Tyc-Karpińska | | Mint: Mennica Polska S.A. | |
| Value: zł 10 | Alloy: Ag 925/1000 (Silver) | Quantity: 19,000 pcs / 18,000 pcs | Quality: Proof |
| Issued: 24 March 1999 | Diameter: 32.00 mm (1.26 in) | Weight: 14.14 g (0.50 oz; 0.45 ozt) | Market value: 250 zł |
Obverse: On the right top side, an image of the eagle as the State Emblem of the Republic of Poland. On the left side of the emblem on a stylized sash, an inscription: 150 ROCZNICA SMIERCI / JULIUSZA SŁOWACKIEGO. On the rim the legend: RZECZPOSPOLITA POLSKA 10 ZŁ. Under the left talon of the Eagle the Mint mark: m/w. Reverse: The bust of Juliusz Słowacki. A circular inscription: CHODZI MI O TO, ABY JĘZYK GIĘTKI / POWIEDZIAŁ WSZYSTKO, CO POMYŚLI GŁOWA.
The Animals of the World: Wolf
| Obverse designer: Ewa Tyc-Karpińska, Reverse designer: Roussanka Nowakowska | | Mint: Mennica Polska S.A. | |
| Value: zł 20 | Alloy: Ag 925/1000 (Silver) | Quantity: 21,000 pcs | Quality: Proof |
| Issued: 14 April 1999 | Diameter: 38.61 mm (1.52 in) | Weight: 28.28 g (1.00 oz; 0.91 ozt) | Market value: 800 zł |
Obverse: An image of the Eagle as the State Emblem of the Republic of Poland. Below, year of the issue: 1999 and the inscription: ZŁ 20 ZŁ. On both sides of the Eagle's talons, an image of the state flag. A semicircular inscription above: RZECZPOSPOLITA POLSKA. Under the left talon of the Eagle, the Mint mark: m/w. Reverse: Images of adult wolves and five pups. A semicircular inscription above: WILK – Canis lupus.
Polish Kings and Princes: Zygmunt II August (1548–1572)
| Coin designer: Ewa Tyc-Karpińska | | Mint: Mennica Polska S.A. | |
| Value: zł 100 | Alloy: Au 900/1000 (Gold) | Quantity: 2,000 pcs | Quality: Proof |
| Issued: 14 April 1999 | Diameter: 21.00 mm (0.83 in) | Weight: 8.00 g (0.28 oz; 0.26 ozt) | Market value: 4500 zł |
Obverse: An image of the Eagle as the State Emblem of the Republic of Poland. On both sides of the Eagle, the date of issue: 1999. Under the Eagle, the legend: ZŁ 100 ZŁ. On the rim, the legend: RZECZPOSPOLITA POLSKA preceded and finished with five pearls. Under the left talon of the Eagle, the Mint mark: m/w. Reverse: The bust of Zygmunt II August in profile. At the background, a fragment of an arras with the King's monogram: letters SA finished with a crown. A semicircular inscription above standing for the King's reign: 1548–1572, and below an inscription: ZYGMUNT II AUGUST.
John Paul II, the Pilgrim (gold)
| Coin designer: Robert Kotowicz | | Mint: Mennica Polska S.A. | |
| Value: zł 100 | Alloy: Au 900/1000 (Gold) | Quantity: 7,000 pcs | Quality: Proof |
| Issued: 26 May 1999 | Diameter: 21.00 mm (0.83 in) | Weight: 8.00 g (0.28 oz; 0.26 ozt) | Market value: 3500 zł |
Obverse: In the middle, an image of the Eagle as the State Emblem of the Republic of Poland. Below, an inscription: 100 ZŁ. Above, a stylised spike of corn; to the right of the spike, the year of issue: 1999. On the rim the legend: RZECZPOSPOLITA POLSKA. Under the left talon of the Eagle the Mint's mark: m/w. Reverse: John Paul's II bust at the background of a stylised crosier. On the left side, an inscription: Jan / Paweł II / Papież. Below an inscription: Pielgrzym.
John Paul II, the Pilgrim (silver)
| Coin designer: Robert Kotowicz | | Mint: Mennica Polska S.A. | |
| Value: zł 10 | Alloy: Ag 925/1000 (Silver) | Quantity: 70,000 pcs | Quality: Proof |
| Issued: 26 May 1999 | Diameter: 32.00 mm (1.26 in) | Weight: 14.14 g (0.50 oz; 0.45 ozt) | Market value: 200 zł |
Obverse: In the middle, a stylised cross. In the top, on the left side, a cross and the letter "M". In the bottom, on the right side, an image of the Eagle as the State Emblem of the Republic of Poland. Below, the year of issue: 1999. A semicircular inscription below: RZECZPOSPOLITA POLSKA. Under the left talon of the Eagle the Mint's mark: m/w. Reverse: John Paul's II bust. On the left side, a stylised cross. In the top, to the left of the cross, a stylised pigeon, and below an inscription: Jan / Paweł II / Papież / Pielgrzym.
Poland's accession to NATO
| Coin designer: Ewa Tyc-Karpińska | | Mint: Mennica Polska S.A. | |
| Value: zł 10 | Alloy: Ag 925/1000 (Silver) | Quantity: 25,000 pcs / 22,000 pcs | Quality: Proof |
| Issued: 23 June 1999 | Diameter: 32.00 mm (1.26 in) | Weight: 14.14 g (0.50 oz; 0.45 ozt) | Market value: 150 zł |
Obverse: An image of the Eagle as the State Emblem of the Republic of Poland at the background of a chessboard. On the rim the legend: RZECZPOSPOLITA POLSKA 10 ZŁ 1999. Under the left talon of the Eagle the Mint mark: m/w. Reverse: On the right side, a helicopter and figures of two soldiers on ropes. On the left side, an image of the globe with a stylized geographic network. Above, a semicircular inscription: WSTĄPIENIE POLSKI, below, on the left side, an inscription: DO NATO at the background of the globe.
The 150th anniversary of Fryderyk Chopin's death (gold)
| Coin designer: Roussanka Nowakowska | | Mint: Mennica Polska S.A. | |
| Value: zł 200 | Alloy: Au 900/1000 (Gold) | Quantity: 2,200 pcs | Quality: Proof |
| Issued: 15 September 1999 | Diameter: 27.00 mm (1.06 in) | Weight: 15.50 g (0.55 oz; 0.50 ozt) | Market value: 5000 zł |
Obverse: In the middle, an image of the eagle as the State Emblem of the Republic of Poland against the background of a stylized music transforming in a sash. On the left side, below the music, the year of issue: 1999. On the top, a semicircular legend: RZECZPOSPOLITA POLSKA, and at the bottom an inscription: 200 / ZŁOTYCH. Under the left talon of the Eagle the Mint mark: m/w. Reverse: A profile of Fryderyk Chopin against the background of a stylized printed music. On the top, the semicircular legend: FRYDERYK CHOPIN. Below the portrait, a semicircular inscription: 150. ROCZNICA ŚMIERCI (150th anniversary of death).
The 150th anniversary of Fryderyk Chopin's death (silver)
| Coin designer: Roussanka Nowakowska | | Mint: Mennica Polska S.A. | |
| Value: zł 10 | Alloy: Ag 925/1000 (Silver) | Quantity: 27,000 pcs / 18,000 pcs | Quality: Proof |
| Issued: 15 September 1999 | Diameter: 32.00 mm (1.26 in) | Weight: 14.14 g (0.50 oz; 0.45 ozt) | Market value: 200 zł |
Obverse: In the middle, an image of the eagle as the State Emblem of the Republic of Poland. Below, stylized stave and willows. On the left side, the year of issue: 1999. At the top, a semicircular inscription: RZECZPOSPOLITA POLSKA, and at the bottom, an inscription: 10 / ZŁOTYCH. Under the left talon of the Eagle the Mint mark: m/w. Reverse: Right profile of Fryderyk Chopin against the background of stylized piano and willows. At the top, the semicircular legend: FRYDERYK CHOPIN. Below the portrait, a semicircular inscription: 150. ROCZNICA ŚMIERCI (150th anniversary of death).
The 600th anniversary of the Cracow Academy resumption
| Obverse designer: Ewa Tyc-Karpińska; Reverse designer: Andrzej Nowakowski | | Mint: Mennica Polska S.A. | |
| Value: zł 10 | Alloy: Ag 925/1000 (Silver) | Quantity: 22,000 pcs / 27,000 pcs | Quality: Proof |
| Issued: 15 September 1999 | Diameter: 32.00 mm (1.26 in) | Weight: 14.14 g (0.50 oz; 0.45 ozt) | Market value: 200 zł |
Obverse: An image of the eagle as the State Emblem of the Republic of Poland. On both sides of the Eagle, the year of issue: 1999; under the Eagle, the legend: ZŁ 10 ZŁ. On the rim the legend: RZECZPOSPOLITA POLSKA preceded and finished with five pearls. Under the left talon of the Eagle the Mint mark: m/w Reverse: A half-figure of the Queen Jadwiga against the background of a stylized yard of Collegium Maius. On the left side below the arcades, crossed scepters in the shield. At the top, a semicircular inscription: 600-lecie ODNOWIENIA AKADEMII KRAKOWSKIEJ (600th anniversary of the Cracow Academy resumption). On the side an inscription: 1400-2000 repeated five times.
The 500th anniversary of birth of Jan Łaski
| Coin designer: Ewa Tyc-Karpińska | | Mint: Mennica Polska S.A. | |
| Value: zł 10 | Alloy: Ag 925/1000 (Silver) | Quantity: 20,000 pcs | Quality: Proof |
| Issued: 15 September 1999 | Diameter: 32.00 mm (1.26 in) | Weight: 14.14 g (0.50 oz; 0.45 ozt) | Market value: 180 zł |
Obverse: An image of the Eagle as the State Emblem of the Republic of Poland against the background of a stylized wall of a temple. Above, a semicircular inscription: RZECZPOSPOLITA POLSKA 1999 10 ZŁ. Below the left talon of the Eagle the Mint mark: m/w. Reverse: Torso of Jan Łaski against the background of a stylized arcade. Above, on the right, torso of writing Erasmus of Rotterdam. In the bottom, a semicircular inscription: JAN ŁASKI – REFORMATOR KOŚCIOŁA (Joannes a Lasco – Church's Reforme); above, on the right a date: 1499–1560. On the side an inscription: 500-LECIE URODZIN, repeated and separated with stars.
Polish kings and princes: Władysław IV Waza (1632–1648)
| Coin designer: Ewa Tyc-Karpińska | | Mint: Mennica Polska S.A. | |
| Value: zł 100 | Alloy: Au 900/1000 (Gold) | Quantity: 2,300 pcs / 2,000 pcs | Quality: Proof |
| Issued: 3 November 1999 | Diameter: 21.00 mm (0.83 in) | Weight: 8.00 g (0.28 oz; 0.26 ozt) | Market value: 3600 zł |
Obverse: An image of the Eagle as the State Emblem of the Republic of Poland. On both sides of the Eagle, the date of issue: 1999. Under the Eagle, the legend: ZŁ 100 ZŁ. On the rim, the legend: RZECZPOSPOLITA POLSKA. Below the left talon of the Eagle the Mint mark: m/w. Reverse: Bust of the King Władysław IV in an octagonal frame. Around the frame, the legend: WŁADYSŁAW IV WAZA / 1632-1648
Polish kings and princes: Władysław IV Waza (bust)
| Coin designer: Ewa Tyc-Karpińska | | Mint: Mennica Polska S.A. | |
| Value: zł 10 | Alloy: Ag 925/1000 (Silver) | Quantity: 20,000 pcs | Quality: Proof |
| Issued: 3 November 1999 | Diameter: 32.00 mm (1.26 in) | Weight: 14.14 g (0.50 oz; 0.45 ozt) | Market value: 300 zł |
Obverse: An image of the Eagle as the State Emblem of the Republic of Poland. On both sides of the Eagle, the date of issue: 1999. Under the Eagle, the legend: ZŁ 10 ZŁ. On the rim, the legend: RZECZPOSPOLITA POLSKA preceded and finished with five pearls. Below the left talon of the Eagle the Mint mark: m/w. Reverse: Bust of the King Władysław IV Vasa. On the right side, a semicircular inscription: WŁADYSŁAW IV WAZA / 1632–1648.
Polish kings and princes: Władysław IV Waza (torso)
| Coin designer: Ewa Tyc-Karpińska | | Mint: Mennica Polska S.A. | |
| Value: zł 10 | Alloy: Ag 925/1000 (Silver) | Quantity: 13,000 pcs | Quality: Proof |
| Issued: 3 November 1999 | Diameter: 32.00 mm (1.26 in) | Weight: 14.14 g (0.50 oz; 0.45 ozt) | Market value: 800 zł |
Obverse: An image of the Eagle as the State Emblem of the Republic of Poland. On both sides of the Eagle, the date of issue: 1999. Under the Eagle, the legend: ZŁ 10 ZŁ. On the rim, the legend: RZECZPOSPOLITA POLSKA preceded and finished with five pearls. Below the left talon of the Eagle the Mint mark: m/w. Reverse: Torso of the King Władysław IV Vasa in an octagonal frame. On the rim, the legend: WŁADYSŁAW IV WAZA / 1632–1648.
Castles and palaces of Poland: Radzyń Podlaski
| Obverse designer: Ewa Tyc-Karpińska, Reverse designer: Robert Kotowicz | | Mint: Mennica Polska S.A. | |
| Value: zł 20 | Alloy: Ag 925/1000 (Silver) | Quantity: 15,000 pcs | Quality: Proof |
| Issued: 1 December 1999 | Diameter: 38.61 mm (1.52 in) | Weight: 28.28 g (1.00 oz; 0.91 ozt) | Market value: 500 zł |
Obverse: An image of the Eagle as the State Emblem of the Republic of Poland in a circle with fleur-de-lises. On both sides of the Eagle, the date of issue: 1999. On the rim the legend: RZECZPOSPOLITA POLSKA ZŁ 20 ZŁ. Under the left talon of the Eagle, the Mint mark: m/w. Reverse: An image of the Potockis' palace in Radzyń Podlaski. Below, a heraldic sculptor's composition and an inscription: RADZYŃ PODLASKI. A semicircular inscription above: PAŁAC POTOCKICH.

== See also ==
- Numismatics
- Regular issue coinage
- Coin grading
