= Commemorative coins of Poland: 1998 =

Commemorative coins offered by Poland in the year 1998

Poland has a selection of gold and silver commemorative coins. In the year 1998 coins were launched in the series: "Polish Kings and Princes", "Castles and Palaces of Poland", "The Animals of the World" and various occasional coins.

== Coins produced ==
XVIIIth Winter Olympic Game, Nagano
Obverse designer: Ewa Tyc-Karpińska, Reverse designer: Robert Kotowicz		Mint: Mennica Polska S.A.	
Value: zł 10	Alloy: Ag 925/1000 (Silver)	Quantity: 30,000 pcs	Quality: Proof
Issued: 25 February 1998	Diameter: 32.00 mm (1.26 in)	Weight: 14.14 g (0.50 oz; 0.45 ozt)	Market value: 150 zł
Obverse: An image of the Eagle as the State Emblem of the Polish Republic. On both sides of the Eagle, the date of issue 19–98. Under the Eagle, the legend: ZŁ 10 ZŁ. On the rim the legend: RZECZPOSPOLITA POLSKA preceded and finished with five pearls. Under the left talon of the Eagle the Mint's mark: m/w. Reverse: An image of a competitor on a snowboard. Above the legend: "XVIII/ZIMOWE/IGRZYSKA/OLIMPIJSKIE". On the left side, a stylised outline of Mount Fuji and a vertical legend: "NAGANO 1998" On the right side: stylised clouds, a snowflake and a pole.
45th anniversary of death of General August Emil Fieldorf
Obverse designer: Ewa Tyc-Karpińska, Reverse designer: Roussanka Nowakowska		Mint: Mennica Polska S.A.	
Value: zł 10	Alloy: Ag 925 (Silver)	Quantity: 17,000 pcs / 14,000 pcs	Quality: Proof
Issued: 7 April 1998	Diameter: 32.00 mm (1.26 in)	Weight: 14.14 g (0.50 oz; 0.45 ozt)	Market value: 250 zł
Obverse: An image of the Eagle as the State Emblem of the Polish Republic. On both sides of the eagle, the date of issue 19–98. Under the Eagle, the legend: ZŁ 10 ZŁ. On the rim the legend: RZECZPOSPOLITA POLSKA preceded and finished with five pearls. Under the left talon of the eagle the Mint's mark m/w. Reverse: The bust of August Emil Fieldorf. On the left side a semi-circular inscription: GEN. BRYG. AUGUST EMIL FIELDORF. On the right side a stylised fragment of a wall with an inscription: "NIL"/1895-/-1953, below the inscription an anchor - the symbol of Fighting Poland.
Polish kings and princes: Sigismund III Vasa (1587–1632)
Coin designer: Ewa Tyc-Karpińska		Mint: Mennica Polska S.A.	
Value: zł 100	Alloy: Au 900/1000 (Gold)	Quantity: 2,500 pcs	Quality: Proof
Issued: 29 April 1998	Diameter: 21.00 mm (0.83 in)	Weight: 8.00 g (0.28 oz; 0.26 ozt)	Market value: 4500 zł
Obverse: An image of the Eagle as the State Emblem of the Republic of Poland. On both sides of the Eagle, the date of issue: 19–98. Under the Eagle, the legend: ZŁ 100 ZŁ. On the rim the legend: RZECZPOSPOLITA POLSKA. Under the left talon of the Eagle the Mint's mark: m/w. Reverse: The bust of King Sigismund III Vasa. On the left side of the image, a semicircular inscription: ZYGMUNT III WAZA, below it the years of the king's reign: 1587–1632.
Polish kings and princes: Sigismund III Vasa (1587–1632) (bust)
Coin designer: Ewa Tyc-Karpińska		Mint: Mennica Polska S.A.	
Value: zł 10	Alloy: Ag 925/1000 (Silver)	Quantity: 22,000 pcs	Quality: Proof
Issued: 29 April 1998	Diameter: 32.00 mm (1.26 in)	Weight: 14.14 g (0.50 oz; 0.45 ozt)	Market value: 260 zł
Obverse: An image of the Eagle as the State Emblem of the Republic of Poland. On both sides of the Eagle, the date of issue: 19–98. Under the Eagle, the legend: ZŁ 10 ZŁ. On the rim the legend: RZECZPOSPOLITA POLSKA preceded and finished with five pearls. Under the left talon of the Eagle the Mint's mark: m/w. Reverse: The bust of King Sigismund III Vasa. On the left side of the image, a semicircular inscription: ZYGMUNT III WAZA, below it the king's reign: 1587–1632.
Polish kings and princes: Sigismund III Vasa (1587–1632) (torso)
Coin designer: Ewa Tyc-Karpińska		Mint: Mennica Polska S.A.	
Value: zł 10	Alloy: Ag 925/1000 (Silver)	Quantity: 14,000 pcs / 7,000 pcs	Quality: Proof
Issued: 29 April 1998	Diameter: 32.00 mm (1.26 in)	Weight: 14.14 g (0.50 oz; 0.45 ozt)	Market value: 600 zł
Obverse: An image of the Eagle as the State Emblem of the Republic of Poland. On both sides of the Eagle, the date of issue: 19–98. Under the Eagle, the legend: ZŁ 10 ZŁ. On the rim the legend: RZECZPOSPOLITA POLSKA preceded and finished with five pearls. Under the left talon of the Eagle the Mint's mark: m/w. Reverse: The torso of King Sigismund III Vasa. On the left side of the image, a semicircular inscription: ZYGMUNT III WAZA, below it the king's reign: 1587–1632.
Castles and Palaces of Poland: The Kórnik Castle
Obverse designer: Ewa Tyc-Karpińska, Reverse designer: Ewa Olszewska-Borys		Mint: Mennica Polska S.A.	
Value: zł 20	Alloy: Ag 925/1000 (Silver)	Quantity: 20,000 pcs	Quality: Proof
Issued: 20 May 1998	Diameter: 38.61 mm (1.52 in)	Weight: 28.28 g (1.00 oz; 0.91 ozt)	Market value: 400 zł
Obverse: An image of the Eagle as the State Emblem of the Republic of Poland circled with badges. On both sides of the Eagle, the date of issue 19–98. On the rim the legend: RZECZPOSPOLITA POLSKA ZŁ 20 ZŁ. Under the left talon of the Eagle the Mint's mark m/w. Reverse: A view of the Kórnik Castle against the background of a stylised fragment of the vault of the Moresque Room. An inscription below: ZAMEK W KÓRNIKU.
The Animals of the World: Natterjack Toad - Bufo calamita
Coin designer: Ewa Tyc-Karpińska		Mint: Mennica Polska S.A.	
Value: zł 20	Alloy: Ag 925/1000 (Silver)	Quantity: 22,000 pcs/ 20,000 pcs	Quality: Proof
Issued: 20 May 1998	Diameter: 38.61 mm (1.52 in)	Weight: 28.28 g (1.00 oz; 0.91 ozt)	Market value: 800 zł
Obverse: An image of the Eagle as the State Emblem of the Republic of Poland. Under the Eagle, the date of issue: 1998, below it the legend: ZŁ 20 ZŁ. On both sides of the Eagle's talons, an image of the State Flag. Above the semi-circular legend: RZECZPOSPOLITA POLSKA. Under the left talon of the Eagle the Mint's mark: m/w. Reverse: An image of a Natterjack Toad in a sandy hole. Above the semi-circular inscription in two lines: ROPUCHA PASKÓWKA/Bufo calamita.
100th anniversary of discovering polonium and radium
Coin designer: Robert Kotowicz		Mint: Mennica Polska S.A.	
Value: zł 20	Alloy: Ag 925/1000 (Silver)	Quantity: 20,000 pcs	Quality: Proof
Issued: 17 June 1998	Diameter: 38.61 mm (1.52 in)	Weight: 28.28 g (1.00 oz; 0.91 ozt)	Market value: 300 zł
Obverse: A stylised drawing of an atom. On the right side, below the drawing, the legend: ZŁ 20 ZŁ. Under the drawing, the legend: RZECZPOSPOLITA / POLSKA. Under the legend, the date of issue: 1998. On the left side an image of the Eagle as the State Emblem of the Republic of Poland. Under the left talon of the Eagle the Mint's mark: m/w. Reverse: On the right side, the figures of Maria Sklodowska-Curie and Pierre Curie against the background of the symbols of elements in the periodic system. In the middle, an inscription: 100 - LECIE / ODKRYCIA / POLONU I RADU (100 anniversary of discovering polonium and radium)
20th anniversary of John Paul's II pontificate (gold)
Coin designer: Ewa Olszewska-Borys		Mint: Mennica Polska S.A.	
Value: zł 200	Alloy: Au 900/1000 (Gold)	Quantity: 5,000 pcs	Quality: Proof
Issued: 14 October 1998	Diameter: 27.00 mm (1.06 in)	Weight: 15.50 g (0.55 oz; 0.50 ozt)	Market value: 9000 zł
Obverse: An image of a stilised chalice. A semicilcular inscription above: RZECZPOSPOLITA POLSKA. In the middle an image of the Eagle as the State Emblem of the Republic of Poland. On both sides of the Eagle, the date of issue 19–98. In the bottom an inscription: ZŁ 200 ZŁ. Under the left talon of the Eagle the Mint's mark: m/w. Reverse: The figure of John Paul II with his arms raised. Below it, hands of pilgrims raised on a welcoming gesture. In the background the image of a stilised cross. A semicilcular inscription above: 20-LECIE PONTYFIKATU JANA PAWŁA II.
20th anniversary of John Paul's II pontificate (silver)
Coin designer: Ewa Olszewska-Borys		Mint: Mennica Polska S.A.	
Value: zł 10	Alloy: Ag 925/1000 (Silver)	Quantity: 65,000 pcs	Quality: Proof
Issued: 14 October 1998	Diameter: 32.00 mm (1.26 in)	Weight: 14.14 g (0.50 oz; 0.45 ozt)	Market value: 220 zł
Obverse: An image of a stilised cross. A semicilcular inscription above: RZECZPOSPOLITA POLSKA and the date of issue: 1998. In the bottom, on the left hand side an inscription: 10 zlotych, on the right a stilised letter M. In the top, on the right side an image of the Eagle as the State Emblem of the Republic of Poland. Under the left talon of the Eagle the Mint's mark: m/w. Reverse: The bust of John Paul II with his arms raised. A semicilcular inscription above: 20-LECIE PONTYFIKATU. A semicilcular inscription below: JANA PAWŁA II.
80th Anniversary of regained independence
Coin designer: Ewa Tyc-Karpińska		Mint: Mennica Polska S.A.	
Value: zł 10	Alloy: Ag 925/1000 (Silver)	Quantity: 20,000 pcs / 14,000 pcs	Quality: Proof
Issued: 9 November 1998	Diameter: 32.00 mm (1.26 in)	Weight: 14.14 g (0.50 oz; 0.45 ozt)	Market value: 250 zł
Obverse: In the central part an image of the Eagle as the State Emblem of the Republic of Poland. Below the Eagle, the date of issue: 1998. A semi-circural inscription above: RZECZPOSPOLITA POLSKA 10 ZŁOTYCH. Under the left talon of the Eagle the Mint's mark m/w. Reverse: In the central part an inscription: 1918, placed against the background of stylised flames. Above it, on the right an inscription: 1998. A semi-circular inscription above: 80 ROCZNICA ODZYSKANIA NIEPODLEGŁOŚCI.
Bicentenary of Adam Mickiewicz's birth
Obverse designer: Ewa Tyc-Karpińska, Reverse designer: Roussanka Nowakowska		Mint: Mennica Polska S.A.	
Value: zł 200	Alloy: Au 900/1000 (Gold)	Quantity: 3,000 pcs	Quality: Proof
Issued: 14 October 1998	Diameter: 27.00 mm (1.06 in)	Weight: 15.50 g (0.55 oz; 0.50 ozt)	Market value: 3500 zł
Obverse: A semi-circular inscription: 200 ZŁ above, and the date of issue 1998, nearby. Below it, in four lines, an inscription:"...Patrz! / jak te myśli dobywam sam z siebie, / Wcielam w słowa, one lecą / ADAM MICKIEWICZ. Below it, an image of the Eagle as the State Emblem of the Republic of Poland. On the left side of the Eagle, in two lines, an oblique inscription: RZECZPOSPOLITA / POLSKA. Under the left talon of the Eagle the Mint's mark M/W. Reverse: An Image of Adam Mickiewicz's head. On the left side of the image a semi-circular inscription: ADAM MICKIEWICZ, on the left - a semi-circular inscription: 1789 - 1855.
50th anniversary of the Universal Declaration of Human Rights
Obverse designer: Ewa Tyc-Karpińska, Reverse designer: Roussanka Nowakowska		Mint: Mennica Polska S.A.	
Value: zł 10	Alloy: Ag 925/1000 (Silver)	Quantity: 14,000 pcs	Quality: Proof
Issued: 7 April 1998	Diameter: 32.00 mm (1.26 in)	Weight: 14.14 g (0.50 oz; 0.45 ozt)	Market value: 300 zł
Obverse: An image of the Eagle as the State Emblem of the Republic of Poland. On both sides of the Eagle, the date of issue: 19 - 98. Under the Eagle, the legend: ZŁ 10 ZŁ. On the rim the legend: RZECZPOSPOLITA POLSKA preceded and finished with five pearls. Under the left talon of the Eagle the Mint's mark m/w. Reverse: In the central part a multiple stylized image of a human. On both sides of the image, palms in a gesture symbolizing protection. A semi-circular inscription above: POWSZECHNA DEKLARACJA and below: PRAW/CZŁOWIEKA. On the side an inscription: 50 ROCZNICA UCHWALENIA repeated three times and separated by stars.

== See also ==
- Numismatics
- Regular issue coinage
- Coin grading
