= Commemorative coins of Poland: 2006 =

Commemorative coins offered by Poland in the year 2006

Poland has a rich selection of Gold and Silver commemorative coins. In the year 2006 coins were launched in the series: "Animals of the World", "History of the Polish Złoty", "The Polish Calendar of Traditional Customs and Rituals", "Monuments of Material Culture in Poland" (previously "Castles and Palaces in Poland"),"History of the Polish Cavalry", "Polish Painters of the Turn of 19th and 20th Centuries" and various occasional coins.

== Table of contents ==
XXth Olympic Winter Games, Turin 2006 (gold)
Coin designer: Robert Kotowicz		Mint: Mennica Polska S.A.	
Value: zł 200	Alloy: Au 900/1000 (Gold)	Quantity: 7,000 pcs / 6,000 pcs	Quality: Proof
Issued: 24 January 2006	Diameter: 27.00 mm (1.06 in)	Weight: 15.50 g (0.55 oz; 0.50 ozt)	Market value: Q4 2008: 1.400 zł
Obverse: At the bottom on the left-hand side, an image of the Eagle established as the state emblem of the Republic of Poland. Above the Eagle, a stylized image of a ski jumper going down the ramp. Below on the left-hand side a semicircular inscription, RZECZPOSPOLITA POLSKA, and the notation of the year of issue, 2006.At the top on the right-hand side an inscription, 200 ZŁ. Below against the background of a stylized jumping hill a visible inscription, TURYN/2006, or a stylized snowflake, depending on the angle of vision. Above the mark of the face value, a stylized fragment of a mountain range. The Mint's mark under the Eagle's left leg. Reverse: On the left-hand side, a stylized image of a ski jumper. Below, an oblique inscription, XX ZIMOWE / IGRZYSKA / OLIMPIJSKIE (20th WINTER / OLYMPIC / GAMES). On the right-hand side, a stylized image of the Olympic torch and a vertical inscription, TURYN / 2006.
XXth Olympic Winter Games, Turin 2006 (silver)
Coin designer: Robert Kotowicz		Mint: Mennica Polska S.A.	
Value: zł 10	Alloy: Ag 925/1000 (Silver)	Quantity: 71,400 pcs / 71,000 pcs	Quality: Proof
Issued: 24 January 2006	Diameter: 32.00 mm (1.26 in)	Weight: 14.14 g (0.50 oz; 0.45 ozt)	Market value: Q4 2008: 55 zł
Obverse: An image of the Eagle established as the state emblem of the Republic of Poland.Above, a stylized image of a snowboarder. On the left-hand side, a vertical inscription, RZECZPOSPOLITA POLSKA, and next to it, on the left-hand side, an inscription, 10/ZŁ. On the right-hand side of the Eagle, the notation of the year of issue, 2006. The Mint's mark, m/w, under the Eagle's left leg. Reverse: A stylized image of a snowboarder. On the left-hand side, a stylized image of the Olympic torch and a vertical inscription, TURYN / 2006. Against the background of a decorative relief stylized images of snowflakes. On the left-hand side, at the bottom, a semicircular inscription, XX ZIMOWE IGRZYSKA OLIMPIJSKIE (20th WINTER / OLYMPIC / GAMES).
XXth Olympic Winter Games, Turin 2006 (silver)
Coin designer: Robert Kotowicz		Mint: Mennica Polska S.A.	
Value: zł 10	Alloy: Ag 925/1000 (Silver)	Quantity: 72,000 pcs	Quality: Proof
Issued: 24 January 2006	Diameter: 32.00 mm (1.26 in)	Weight: 14.14 g (0.50 oz; 0.45 ozt)	Market value: Q4 2008: 55 zł
Obverse: On the left-hand side, an image of the Eagle established as the state emblem of the Republic of Poland. On the left-hand side of the Eagle, a semicircular inscription, RZECZPOSPOLITA POLSKA. In the central part, a stylized image of a couple of figure skaters. On the right-hand side, an inscription, 10/ZŁ. Below this inscription, the notation of the year of issue, 2006. The Mint's mark, m/w, under the Eagle's left leg. Reverse: In the central part, a stylized image of a performing female soloist figure skater. On the left-hand side, a visible inscription, TURYN, or the notation of the year of issue, 2006, depending on the angle of vision. A circumscription, XX ZIMOWE IGRZYSKA OLIMPIJSKIE (20th WINTER / OLYMPIC / GAMES).
Animals of the World: Marmot (Marmota marmota)
Obverse designer: Ewa Tyc-Karpińska, Reverse designer: Andrzej Nowakowski		Mint: Mennica Polska S.A.	
Value: zł 20	Alloy: Ag 925/1000 (Silver)	Quantity: 60,000 pcs	Quality: Proof
Issued: 28 February 2006	Diameter: 38.61 mm (1.52 in)	Weight: 28.28 g (1.00 oz; 0.91 ozt)	Market value: Q4 2008: 370 zł
Obverse: The image of the Eagle established as the emblem of the Republic of Poland. Under the Eagle the notation of the year of issue, 2006, below an inscription, ZŁ 20 ZŁ. On the sides of the Eagle's legs, images of the State flag. At the top, a semicircular inscription, RZECZPOSPOLITA POLSKA. Under the Eagle's left leg, the mint's mark: m/w Reverse: On the left-hand side, an image of an adult marmot standing on its hind legs. On the right-hand side, images of two young marmots on a mountain rock. In the background, a stylised image of a mountain landscape. At the top, a semicircular inscription, ŚWISTAK – Marmota marmota.
History of the Polish Złoty: 10 złoty of 1932 issue
Coin designer: Andrzej Nowakowski		Mint: Mennica Polska S.A.	
Value: zł 10	Alloy: Ag 925/1000 (Silver)	Quantity: 61,000 pcs	Quality: Proof
Issued: 29 March 2006	Diameter: 32.00 mm (1.26 in)	Weight: 14.14 g (0.50 oz; 0.45 ozt)	Market value: Q4 2008: 55 zł
Obverse: On the left-hand side at the top, an image of the Eagle established as the emblem of the Republic of Poland. Above, a semicircular inscription, RZECZPOSPOLITA POLSKA. On the right-hand side an image of the obverse of the 10 zł coin from 1932. Above, on the right-hand side, the notation of the year of issue, 2006. In the background a stylised image of the front office of the seat of the National Bank of Poland at Bielańska street.At the bottom, an inscription, 10 ZŁ. Under the Eagle's left leg, the mint's mark: m/w Reverse: On the right-hand side the image of the reverse of the 10 zł coin from 1932. At the bottom, on the left-hand side, stylised images of four peacock feathers. At the top, on the left-hand side, an inscription, DZIEJE ZŁOTEGO (History of the Polish Złoty).
The 2006 FIFA World Cup Germany (gold)
Coin designer: Urszula Walerzak		Mint: Mennica Polska S.A.	
Value: zł 100	Alloy: Ag 900/1000 (Gold)	Quantity: 10,500 pcs	Quality: Proof
Issued: 26 April 2006	Diameter: 21.00 mm (0.83 in)	Weight: 8.00 g (0.28 oz; 0.26 ozt)	Market value: Q4 2008: 600 zł
Obverse: Centrally, against the background of a stylised fragment of a football, an image of the Eagle established as the State Emblem of the Republic of Poland. Above the Eagle, on the edge of the football, stylised figures of six footballers.At the top, a semicircular inscription, RZECZPOSPOLITA POLSKA, the notation of the year of issue, 2006, and an inscription, 100 ZŁ. The Mint's mark, m/w, next to the Eagle's left leg. Reverse: Against the background of a stylised image of the central part of a football pitch, stylised images of two footballers and a football. Above, an inscription, NIEMCY/2006 (Germany/2006). On the right-hand side, an inscription, FIFA. On the left-hand side, a semicircular inscription, MISTRZOSTWA ŚWIATA W PIŁCE NOŻNEJ (Football World Cup).
The 2006 FIFA World Cup Germany (plated with gold)
Coin designer: Robert Kotowicz		Mint: Mennica Polska S.A.	
Value: zł 10	Alloy: core: 925/1000 Ag plated with 999/1000 Au ring: 925/1000 Ag	Quantity: 80,500 pcs	Quality: Proof
Issued: 26 April 2006	Diameter: 32.00 mm (1.26 in)	Weight: 14.14 g (0.50 oz; 0.45 ozt)	Market value: Q4 2008: 75 zł
Obverse: Centrally, an image of the Eagle established as the State Emblem of the Republic of Poland. Around the Eagle, a semicircular inscription, RZECZPOSPOLITA POLSKA, and the notation of the year of issue, 2006. Around, a stylised goalkeeper's net and against its background, below the notation of the year of issue, an inscription, 10 ZŁ. The Mint's mark, m/w, under the Eagle's left leg. Reverse: A stylised image of a footballer kicking the ball. Above, against the background of a stylised image of the Sun, a stylised image of a football. On the left-hand side of the ball, a semicircular inscription, FIFA. On the rim, the legend, MISTRZOSTWA ŚWIATA W PIŁCE NOŻNEJ NIEMCY 2006 (Football World Cup).
The 2006 FIFA World Cup Germany (silver)
Coin designer: Urszula Walerzak		Mint: Mennica Polska S.A.	
Value: zł 10	Alloy: Ag 925/1000 (Silver)	Quantity: 70,000 pcs	Quality: Proof
Issued: 26 April 2006	Diameter: 32.00 mm (1.26 in)	Weight: 14.14 g (0.50 oz; 0.45 ozt)	Market value: Q4 2008: 65 zł
Obverse: On the right-hand side, a fragment of a stylised football. Against its background: on the left-hand side, an image of the Eagle established as the State Emblem of the Republic of Poland, and on the right-hand side, an inscription, 10 ZŁ. On the left-hand side, a semicircular inscription, RZECZPOSPOLITA POLSKA, and the notation of the year of issue, 2006. The Mint's mark, m/w, under the Eagle's left leg Reverse: On the right-hand side, against the background of a stylised image of the central part of a football pitch, an image of a running footballer. At the bottom, on the left-hand side, an image of a football, alternating depending on the angle of vision. On the right-hand side, a semicircular inscription, MISTRZOSTWA ŚWIATA W PIŁCE NOŻNEJ (Football World Cup). At the top, on the left-hand side, an inscription, NIEMCY/2006 (Germany/2006). At the bottom, on the left-hand side, an inscription, FIFA.
The Polish Calendar of Traditional Customs and Rituals: St. John's Night
Coin designer: Robert Kotowicz		Mint: Mennica Polska S.A.	
Value: zł 20	Alloy: Ag 925/1000 (Silver) and hologram	Quantity: 65,000 pcs	Quality: Proof
Issued: 25 May 2006	Diameter: 38.61 mm (1.52 in)	Weight: 28.28 g (1.00 oz; 0.91 ozt)	Market value: Q4 2008: 300 zł
Obverse: On the right-hand side, an image of the Eagle established as the State Emblem of the Republic of Poland. Below, an inscription 20 / ZŁ. In the central part and above the Eagle, images of girls and boys dancing around a bonfire, against the background of fronds of fern. At the bottom, a semicircular inscription, RZECZPOSPOLITA POLSKA, and the notation of the year of issue, 2006. The Mint's mark, m/w, under the Eagle's left leg. Reverse: In the central part, a hologram with a stylized image of a fern flower, changing colours depending on the angle of vision. On the rim, against the background of a decorative low relief, stylized images of two dwarfs. At the bottom, a semicircular inscription, NOC ŚWIĘTOJAŃSKA (St.John's Night).
30th Anniversary of June '76
Coin designer: Ewa Olszewska-Borys		Mint: Mennica Polska S.A.	
Value: zł 10	Alloy: Ag 925/1000 (Silver)	Quantity: 56,000 pcs / 59,000 pcs	Quality: Proof
Issued: 21 June 2006	Diameter: 32.00 mm (1.26 in)	Weight: 14.14 g (0.50 oz; 0.45 ozt)	Market value: Q4 2008: 58 zł
Obverse: An image of the Eagle, established as the State Emblem of the Republic of Poland. At the top, a semicircular inscription, RZECZPOSPOLITA POLSKA. On the left-hand side of the Eagle, an inscription, 10, on the right-hand side, an inscription, ZŁ. Below the Eagle, a stylised image of a broken railway track. At the bottom, the notation of the year of issue, 2006. The Mint's mark, M/W, under the Eagle's left leg. Reverse: Against the background of a stylised image of a cordon of militia officers wearing helmets and shields, a stylised image of a woman and a boy superimposed. At the top, a semicircular inscription, 30. ROCZNICA (30th anniversary); at the bottom, a semicircular inscription, CZERWCA 1976 (of June 1976).
Monuments of Material Culture in Poland: The Church in Haczów
Coin designer: Urszula Walerzak		Mint: Mennica Polska S.A.	
Value: zł 20	Alloy: Ag 925/1000 (Silver) and brown paint	Quantity: 64,000 pcs	Quality: Proof
Issued: 13 September 2006	Diameter: 38.61 mm (1.52 in)	Weight: 28.28 g (1.00 oz; 0.91 ozt)	Market value: Q4 2008: 150 zł
Obverse: An image of the Eagle, established as the State Emblem of the Republic of Poland against the background of stylized wood. A semicircular inscription, RZECZPOSPOLITA POLSKA, a notation of the year of issue, 2006, and, 20 ZŁ. The Mint's mark, M/W, under the Eagle's left leg. Reverse: In the central part, a stylized image of the Church in Haczow against the background of brown stylized wood. On the left-hand side and right-hand side a semicircular inscription, KOŚCIÓŁ W HACZOWIE (Church in Haczów).
The Centenary of the Warsaw School of Economics (gold)
Coin designer: Ewa Tyc-Karpińska		Mint: Mennica Polska S.A.	
Value: zł 200	Alloy: Ag 900/1000 (Gold)	Quantity: 8,000 pcs	Quality: Proof
Issued: 11 October 2006	Diameter: 27.00 mm (1.06 in)	Weight: 15.50 g (0.55 oz; 0.50 ozt)	Market value: Q4 2008: 1400 zł
Obverse: On the right-hand side, image of the Eagle established as the State Emblem of the Republic of Poland. Above the Eagle, the notation of the year of issue, 2006. On the left-hand side, stylized image of the Eagle from the banner of the Warsaw School of Economics. An inscription, RZECZPOSPOLITA / POLSKA / 200 ZŁ below. The Mint's mark, m/w, under the Eagle's left leg. Reverse: In the central part, stylized image of the logo of SGH; below, an inscription, 1906–2006. At the bottom, a stylized image of the facade of the School. An inscription on the rim SZKOŁA GŁÓWNA HANDLOWA W WARSZAWIE (Warsaw School of Economics).
The Centenary of the Warsaw School of Economics (silver)
Coin designer: Ewa Tyc-Karpińska		Mint: Mennica Polska S.A.	
Value: zł 10	Alloy: Ag 925/1000 (Silver) (regular nonagon inscribed in a circle)	Quantity: 59,000 pcs	Quality: Proof
Issued: 11 October 2006	Diameter: 32.00 mm (1.26 in)	Weight: 14.14 g (0.50 oz; 0.45 ozt)	Market value: Q4 2008: 68 zł
Obverse: Image of the Eagle established as the State Emblem of the Republic of Poland, a stylized pyramid in the background. At the top: the notation of the year of issue, 2006. On the left-hand side and on the right-hand side, oblique inscriptions, 10 ZŁ. An inscription, RZECZPOSPOLITA/ POLSKA below the Eagle. The Mint's mark, m/w, under the Eagle's left leg. Reverse: In the central part, stylized image of the globe, in the background on the left-hand side, stylized image of the logo of SGH.At the bottom: stylized image of the facade of the School, an inscription, 1906-2006 below. At the top, a semicircular inscription, SZKOŁA GŁÓWNA HANDLOWA W WARSZAWIE (Warsaw School of Economics).
500th Anniversary of Proclamation of the Jan Łaski's Statute (gold)
Coin designer: Roussanka Nowakowska		Mint: Mennica Polska S.A.	
Value: zł 100	Alloy: Au 900/1000 (Gold)	Quantity: 9,000 pcs	Quality: Proof
Issued: 6 November 2006	Diameter: 21.00 mm (0.83 in)	Weight: 8.00 g (0.28 oz; 0.26 ozt)	Market value: Q4 2008: 800 zł
Obverse: At the top, an image of the Eagle established as the State Emblem of the Republic of Poland. Below the Eagle, a stylised image of a book with a hanging seal attached and an inscription, 100 ZŁ. On the left side of the book a notation of the year of issue, 2006. At the top, a semicircular inscription, RZECZPOSPOLITA POLSKA. The Mint's mark, m/w, under the Eagle's left leg. Reverse: The image of the Chancellor Jan üaski holding a book. On the left side, on a stylised board, an inscription: 500-LECIE WYDANIA STATUTU ŁASKIEGO (500th anniversary of the publication of the Statute by Laski).
500th Anniversary of Proclamation of the Jan Łaski's Statute (silver)
Coin designer: Roussanka Nowakowska		Mint: Mennica Polska S.A.	
Value: zł 10	Alloy: Ag 925/1000 (Silver)	Quantity: 57,000 pcs	Quality: Proof
Issued: 6 November 2006	Diameter: 32.00 mm (1.26 in)	Weight: 14.14 g (0.50 oz; 0.45 ozt)	Market value: Q4 2008: 55 zł
Obverse: On the right side, an image of the Eagle established as the State Emblem of the Republic of Poland, on the left side, an image of a pair of scales. Below, a stylised image of a book with a hanging seal attached and an inscription, 10 ZŁ. Above the Eagle and a pair of scales, a notation of the year of issue, 2006. At the top, a semicircular inscription, RZECZPOSPOLITA POLSKA. The Mint's mark, m/w, under the Eagle's left leg Reverse: In the central part, a stylised image of a fragment of woodcut representing the King Aleksander Jagiellończyk (Alexander Jagiellon) sitting on a throne and the Chancellor Jan Łaski holding the Statute and a seal die. Above the throne a semicircular inscription, 500-LECIE WYDANIA STATUTU ŁASKIEGO (500th anniversary of the publication of the Statute by Łaski). On the rim, stylised images of 23 coats of arms of: state, fiefdoms and lands encompassed in the Kingdom of Poland.
History of the Polish Cavalry: The Piast Horseman (gold)
Coin designer: Ewa Tyc-Karpińska		Mint: Mennica Polska S.A.	
Value: zł 200	Alloy: Ag 900/1000 (Gold)	Quantity: 10,000 pcs	Quality: Proof
Issued: 22 November 2006	Diameter: 27.00 mm (1.06 in)	Weight: 15.50 g (0.55 oz; 0.50 ozt)	Market value: Q4 2008: 1400 zł
Obverse: On the left, an image of the Eagle established as the state Emblem of the Republic of Poland. On the right, an image of Szczerbiec (lit. notched sword), the sword that was traditionally used in the coronation ceremony of Polish kings. In the background, a motive from the sword's hilt. On the right, the notation of the year of issue: 2006. On the top right, a semicircular inscription: RZECZPOSPOLITA POLSKA (the Republic of Poland). At the bottom, an inscription: 200 ZŁ. Under the Eagle's left leg, the mint's mark: m/w. Reverse: In the centre, a stylised image of an armoured mounted sergeant with a bared sword. In the background, the sergeant's shadow. On the left, a semicircular inscription: JEŹDZIEC PIASTOWSKI (the Piast Horseman)
History of the Polish Cavalry: The Piast Horseman (silver)
Coin designer: Ewa Tyc-Karpińska		Mint: Mennica Polska S.A.	
Value: zł 10	Alloy: Ag 925/1000 (Silver)	Quantity: 62,000 pcs	Quality: Proof
Issued: 22 November 2006	Dimensions: length: 22.00 mm (0.87 in) width: 32.00 mm (1.26 in)	Weight: 14.14 g (0.50 oz; 0.45 ozt)	Market value: Q4 2008: 100 zł
Obverse: An image of the Eagle established as the state Emblem of the Republic of Poland. Above the eagle, on the right, a semicircular inscription: RZECZPOSPOLITA POLSKA (the Republic of Poland) and the notation of the year of issue: 2006. Below the eagle, on the right, an inscription: 10 ZŁ, on the left, images of two spearheads on poles. Under the Eagle's left leg, the mint's mark: m/w. Reverse: In the centre, a stylised image of an armoured mounted sergeant with a bared sword. In the background, the shadow of an armoured mounted sergeant holding a spear. On the top right, a diagonal inscription: JEŹDZIEC PIASTOWSKI (the Piast Horseman).
Polish Painters of the Turn of 19th & 20th Centuries: Aleksander Gierymski (1850–1901)
Coin designer: Roussanka Nowakowska		Mint: Mennica Polska S.A.	
Value: zł 20	Alloy: 925/1000 Ag (Silver) and paints: red, yellow, green and blue	Quantity: 66,000 pcs	Quality: Proof
Issued: 5 December 2006	Dimensions: length: 40.00 mm (1.57 in) width: 28.00 mm (1.10 in)	Weight: 28.28 g (1.00 oz; 0.91 ozt)	Market value: Q4 2008: 100 zł
Obverse: A stylised image of fragments of Aleksander Gierymski's painting "Jewess with Lemons" of 1881. At the top, on the right side, an image of the Eagle established as the State Emblem of the Republic of Poland. Around the Eagle, an inscription, RZECZPOSPOLITA POLSKA, a notation of the year of issue, 2006 and an inscription, 20 zł. The Mint's mark, m/w, under the Eagle's left leg. Reverse: An effigy of Aleksander Gierymski from the painting "Self-Portrait with a Palette" of 1891–1892. On the right side, a stylised image of a fragment of the painting "Feast of Trumpets" of 1890. On the left side, a vertical inscription, ALEKSANDER/GIERYMSKI/1850-1901. In the left bottom corner, a palette and three paintbrushes. On the palette, paints: red, yellow, green and blue.

== See also ==
- Numismatics
- Regular issue coinage
- Coin grading
