= Commemorative coins of Poland: 2000 =

Commemorative coins offered by Poland in the year 2000

Poland has a rich selection of gold and silver commemorative coins. In the year 2000 coins were launched in the series: "Animals of the World", "Castles and palaces of Poland", "Polish kings and princes" and various occasional coins.

== Table of contents ==
The Year 2000 – the turn of millenniums
Coin designer: Ewa Tyc-Karpińska		Mint: Mennica Polska S.A.	
Value: zł 200	Alloy: outer ring: 900/1000 Au inner ring: 925/1000 Ag core: 900/1000 Au	Quantity: 6,000 pcs	Quality: Proof
Issued: 16 February 2000	Diameter: 27.00 mm (1.06 in)	Weight: 13.60 g (0.48 oz; 0.44 ozt)	Market value: 1.200 zł
Obverse: In the centre, a stylized image of the globe and orbits. Below, the date of issue: 2000. Above, on the left side, an image of the Eagle as the State Emblem of the Republic of Poland. On the rim the legend: RZECZPOSPOLITA POLSKA 200 ZL. Under the left talon of the Eagle, the Mint mark: m/w. Reverse: A stylized combination of fragments of: figures in the binary notation, printed circuit, DNA molecule, and elementary particles. In the inner ring, an inscription: ROK 2000 (year 2000).
The Great Jubilee of the Year 2000
Coin designer: Ewa Olszewska-Borys		Mint: Mennica Polska S.A.	
Value: zł 10	Alloy: Ag 925/1000 (Silver)	Quantity: 60,000 pcs	Quality: Proof
Issued: 8 March 2000	Diameter: 32.00 mm (1.26 in)	Weight: 14.14 g (0.50 oz; 0.45 ozt)	Market value: 100 zł
Obverse: In the center, an image of the Eagle as the State Emblem of the Republic of Poland against the background of a stylized rosette. Below, an inscription: 10 ZŁ. On the rim, the legend: RZECZPOSPOLITA POLSKA 2000. Under the left talon of the Eagle, the Mint mark: m/w. Reverse: Against the background of a cross, in the central part, joint Greek letters: X (chi) and P (rho) – the Christ's monogram, and A (alfa) and ω (omega) – an early Christian symbol of Jesus Christ. Between the cross's arms, symbols of Evangelists: a man and an inscription: Św. Mateusz (St. Matthew), a lion and an inscription: Św. Marek (St. Mark), a bull and an inscription: Św. Łukasz (St. Luke), and an eagle and an inscription: Św. Jan (St. John). In the rim, an inscription: WIELKI JUBILEUSZ ROKU 2000 (the Great Jubilee of the Year 2000). On the side an inscription: WIELKI JUBILEUSZ ROKU 2000 twice repeated, separated with stars (the Great Jubilee of the Year 2000).
The 1000th anniversary of the convention in Gniezno (gold 200 zł)
Coin designer: Robert Kotowicz		Mint: Mennica Polska S.A.	
Value: zł 200	Alloy: Au 900/1000 (Gold)	Quantity: 1,250 pcs	Quality: Proof
Issued: 8 March 2000	Diameter: 27.00 mm (1.06 in)	Weight: 15.50 g (0.55 oz; 0.50 ozt)	Market value: 17,000 zł
Obverse: On the right, in a stylized oval, an image of the Eagle as the State Emblem of the Republic of Poland, and the year of issue: 2000. On the left, a stylized image of the obverse of Bolesław Chrobry's coin (denar). A semicircular inscription above: RZECZPOSPOLITA. Below, an inscription: 200 ZŁ. At the bottom, a semicircular inscription: POLSKA. Under the left talon of the Eagle, the Mint mark: m/w. Reverse: Stylized images of sitting both Bolesław Chrobry and Otto III. At the background, an ornament and elements of the Roman architecture. Above, a semicircular inscription: 1000-LECIE (1000th anniversary). At the bottom, a stylized lion on a runner. In the rim, an inscription: ZJAZDU W GNIEŹNIE (of the congress in Gniezno).
The 1000th anniversary of the convention in Gniezno (gold 100 zł)
Coin designer: Robert Kotowicz		Mint: Mennica Polska S.A.	
Value: zł 100	Alloy: Au 900/1000 (Gold)	Quantity: 2,200 pcs	Quality: Proof
Issued: 8 March 2000	Diameter: 21.00 mm (0.83 in)	Weight: 8.00 g (0.28 oz; 0.26 ozt)	Market value: 3,300 zł
Obverse: On the right, in a stylized oval, an image of the Eagle as the State Emblem of the Republic of Poland, and the year of issue: 2000. On the left, a stylized image of the obverse of Bolesław Chrobry's coin (denar). A semicircular inscription above: RZECZPOSPOLITA. Below, an inscription: 100 ZŁ. At the bottom, a semicircular inscription: POLSKA. Under the left talon of the Eagle, the Mint mark: m/w. Reverse: Stylized images of sitting both Bolesław Chrobry and Otto III. At the background, an ornament and elements of the Roman architecture. Above, a semicircular inscription: 1000-LECIE (1000th anniversary). At the bottom, a stylized lion on a runner. In the rim, an inscription: ZJAZDU W GNIEŹNIE (of the congress in Gniezno).
The 1000th anniversary of the convention in Gniezno(silver)
Coin designer: Robert Kotowicz		Mint: Mennica Polska S.A.	
Value: zł 10	Alloy: ring: 925/1000 Ag core: 925/1000 Ag oxidized	Quantity: 32,000 pcs	Quality: Proof
Issued: 8 March 2000	Diameter: 32.00 mm (1.26 in)	Weight: 14.14 g (0.50 oz; 0.45 ozt)	Market value: 350 zł
Obverse: On the right, in a stylized oval, an image of the Eagle as the State Emblem of the Republic of Poland, and the year of issue: 2000. On the left, a stylized image of the obverse of Bolesław Chrobry's coin (denar). A semicircular inscription above: RZECZPOSPOLITA. Below, an inscription: 10 ZŁ. At the bottom, a semicircular inscription: POLSKA. Under the left talon of the Eagle, the Mint mark: m/w. Reverse: Stylized images of sitting both Bolesław Chrobry and Otto III. At the background, an ornament and elements of the Roman architecture. Above, a semicircular inscription: 1000-LECIE (1000th anniversary). At the bottom, a stylized lion on a runner. In the rim, an inscription: ZJAZDU W GNIEŹNIE (of the congress in Gniezno).
The Animals of the World: Hoopoe
Obverse designer: Ewa Tyc-Karpińska, Reverse designer: Roussanka Nowakowska		Mint: Mennica Polska S.A.	
Value: zł 20	Alloy: Ag 925/1000 (Silver)	Quantity: 24,000 pcs	Quality: Proof
Issued: 5 April 2000	Diameter: 38.61 mm (1.52 in)	Weight: 28.28 g (1.00 oz; 0.91 ozt)	Market value: 900 zł
Obverse: An image of the Eagle as the State Emblem of the Republic of Poland. Under the Eagle, the year of issue: 2000. Below, an inscription: ZŁ 20 ZŁ. On both sides of the Eagle's talons, an image of the State flag. Above, a semicircular inscription: RZECZPOSPOLITA POLSKA. Under the left talon of the Eagle, the Mint mark: m/w. Reverse: An image of a hoopoe sitting on a willow. At the background: a willow, a fence and a cottage. Above on the right, a semicircular inscription: Dudek – Upupa epops.
Castles and Palaces of Poland: Palace in Wilanów
Obverse designer: Ewa Tyc-Karpińska, Reverse designer: Andrzej Nowakowski		Mint: Mennica Polska S.A.	
Value: zł 20	Alloy: Ag 925/1000 (Silver)	Quantity: 24,000 pcs	Quality: Proof
Issued: 17 May 2000	Diameter: 38.61 mm (1.52 in)	Weight: 28.28 g (1.00 oz; 0.91 ozt)	Market value: 300 zł
Obverse: An image of the Eagle as the State Emblem of the Republic of Poland, surrounded by a circle of fleur-de-lises. On both sides of the Eagle the year of issue: 20–00. On the rim, the legend: RZECZPOSPOLITA POLSKA ZŁ 20 ZŁ. Under the left talon of the Eagle, the Mint mark: m/w. Reverse: An image of the west elevation of the Wilanów palace. Below an eagle having Jan III Sobieski's coat of arms on its breast. On the left side a fragment of the gate to the palace with the figure of Polish Mars (Mars Sarmacki). A semicircular inscription above: PAŁAC W WILANOWIE (Palace in Wilanów).
Wrocław millennium (gold)
Coin designer: Roussanka Nowakowska		Mint: Mennica Polska S.A.	
Value: zł 200	Alloy: Au 900/1000 (Gold)	Quantity: 2,000 pcs	Quality: Proof
Issued: 7 June 2000	Diameter: 27.00 mm (1.06 in)	Weight: 15.50 g (0.55 oz; 0.50 ozt)	Market value: 5.000 zł
Obverse: An image of the Eagle as the State Emblem of the Republic of Poland. Next to the right talon of the eagle the notation specifying year of issue: 2000. Around the eagle and notation specifying the year of mintage, irregular ornament of beads. Below a semi circular inscription 200 ZŁOTYCH. Above a semicircular inscription: RZECZPOSPOLITA POLSKA, separated by stars, surrounded by an irregular ornament of beads. Under the left talon of the Eagle the Mint mark: m/w. Reverse: A stylised image of Saint John the Baptist with Wrocław coat of arms. Around the image an irregular ornament of beads and an inscription: TYSIĄCLECIE WROCŁAWIA (WROCŁAW MILLENNIUM) separated by stars. In a semicircle an irregular ornament of beads.
Wrocław millennium (silver)
Coin designer: Roussanka Nowakowska		Mint: Mennica Polska S.A.	
Value: zł 10	Alloy: Ag 925/1000 (Silver)	Quantity: 32,000 pcs	Quality: Proof
Issued: 7 June 2000	Diameter: 32.00 mm (1.26 in)	Weight: 14.14 g (0.50 oz; 0.45 ozt)	Market value: 180 zł
Obverse: On the background of a stylised image of the Town Hall in Wrocław an image of the Eagle as the State Emblem of the Republic of Poland. Over the eagle on the right side the notation specifying the year of mintage: 2000. On the left side of the eagle inscription: 10 and semicircular inscription ZŁOTYCH. Over it a semicircular description: RZECZPOSPOLITA POLSKA. Under the left talon of the Eagle the Mint mark: m/w. Reverse: Image of Wrocław coat of arms introduced into a composition of a fragment of a portal. Under it a semicircular description: TYSIĄCLECIE WROCŁAWIA (Wrocław Millennium)
The 20th Anniversary of forming the Solidarity Trade Union (gold)
Coin designer: Robert Kotowicz		Mint: Mennica Polska S.A.	
Value: zł 200	Alloy: Au 900/1000 (Gold)	Quantity: 2,500 pcs	Quality: Proof
Issued: 23 August 2000	Diameter: 32.00 mm (1.26 in)	Weight: 23.32 g (0.82 oz; 0.75 ozt)	Market value: 8.500zł
Obverse: An image of the Eagle as the State Emblem of the Republic of Poland, on both sides of the Eagle the year of issue: 20–00. Under the Eagle an inscription: ZŁ 200 ZŁ, on the rim a semicircular description: RZECZPOSPOLITA POLSKA. Under the left talon of the Eagle, the Mint mark: m/w. Reverse: On the right side images of two children, on the left side inscription SOLIDARNOŚĆ, made in red and white enamel and inscription 1980–2000. In the background an image of a fragment of the globe with stylised geographical grid and a fragment of the outline of Europe
The 20th Anniversary of forming the Solidarity Trade Union (silver)
Obverse designer: Ewa Tyc-Karpińska, Reverse designer: Robert Kotowicz		Mint: Mennica Polska S.A.	
Value: zł 10	Alloy: Ag 900/1000 (Silver)	Quantity: 40,000 pcs	Quality: Proof
Issued: 23 August 2000	Diameter: 32.00 mm (1.26 in)	Weight: 14.14 g (0.50 oz; 0.45 ozt)	Market value: 200 zł
Obverse: An image of the Eagle as the State Emblem of the Republic of Poland, on both sides of the Eagle the year of issue: 20–00, under the Eagle a description: ZŁ 10 ZŁ, on the rim a semicircular description: RZECZPOSPOLITA POLSKA, preceded and followed by five beads. Under the left talon of the Eagle, the Mint mark: m/w. Reverse: On the right side images of two children, on the left Polish flag, made in red and white enamel and inscription SOLIDARNOŚĆ / 1980–2000. In the background an image of a fragment of the globe with stylised geographical grid and a fragment of the outline of Europe.
Polish Kings and Princes: Queen Jadwiga (1384–1399)
Obverse designer: Ewa Tyc-Karpińska, Reverse designer: Stanisława Wątróbska-Frindt		Mint: Mennica Polska S.A.	
Value: zł 100	Alloy: Au 900/1000 (Gold)	Quantity: 2,000 pcs	Quality: Proof
Issued: 6 September 2000	Diameter: 21.00 mm (0.83 in)	Weight: 8.00 g (0.28 oz; 0.26 ozt)	Market value: 3.800zł
Obverse: Image of the Eagle as the State Emblem of the Republic of Poland, on its sides the notation specifying the year of mintage: 20–00, under the Eagle description: ZŁ 100 ZŁ, in the rim an inscription: RZECZPOSPOLITA POLSKA. Under the left talon of the Eagle the Mint mark: m/w. Reverse: A bust of the Queen Jadwiga based on the drawing by Jan Matejko, above a semicircular inscription JADWIGA 1384–1399.
Polish Kings and Princes: Jan II Kazimierz(1648–1668)
Coin designer: Ewa Tyc-Karpińska		Mint: Mennica Polska S.A.	
Value: zł 100	Alloy: Au 900/1000 (Gold)	Quantity: 2,000 pcs	Quality: Proof
Issued: 27 September 2000	Diameter: 21.00 mm (0.83 in)	Weight: 8.00 g (0.28 oz; 0.26 ozt)	Market value: 3.500zł
Obverse: Image of the Eagle as the State Emblem of the Republic of Poland, on its sides the notation specifying the year of mintage: 20–00, under the eagle description: ZŁ 100 ZŁ, on the rim an inscription: RZECZPOSPOLITA POLSKA. Under the left talon of the Eagle the Mint mark: m/w. Reverse: Bust of the King Jan II Kazimierz. On the left side a diagonal inscription Jan II Kazimierz / 1648–1668.
Polish kings and princes: Jan II Kazimierz (bust)
Coin designer: Ewa Tyc-Karpińska		Mint: Mennica Polska S.A.	
Value: zł 10	Alloy: Ag 925/1000 (Silver)	Quantity: 20,000 pcs	Quality: Proof
Issued: 27 September 2000	Diameter: 32.00 mm (1.26 in)	Weight: 14.14 g (0.50 oz; 0.45 ozt)	Market value: 300 zł
Obverse: Image of the Eagle as the State Emblem of the Republic of Poland, on its sides the notation specifying the year of mintage: 20–00, under the Eagle description: ZŁ 10 ZŁ, on the rim an inscription: RZECZPOSPOLITA POLSKA, preceded and followed by five beads. Under the left talon of the Eagle the Mint mark: m/w. Reverse: Bust of the King Jan II Kazimierz. On the left side a semicircular inscription Jan II Kazimierz 1648–1668.
Polish kings and princes: Jan II Kazimierz (torso)
Coin designer: Ewa Tyc-Karpińska		Mint: Mennica Polska S.A.	
Value: zł 10	Alloy: Ag 925/1000 (Silver)	Quantity: 14,000 pcs	Quality: Proof
Issued: 27 September 2000	Diameter: 32.00 mm (1.26 in)	Weight: 14.14 g (0.50 oz; 0.45 ozt)	Market value: 550 zł
Obverse: Image of the Eagle as the State Emblem of the Republic of Poland, on its sides the notation specifying the year of mintage: 20–00, under the Eagle description: ZŁ 10 ZŁ, on the rim an inscription: RZECZPOSPOLITA POLSKA, preceded and followed by five beads. Under the left talon of the Eagle the Mint mark: m/w. Reverse: Half figure of the King Jan II Kazimierz. On the sides of the image dates: 1648, 1668. Below a semicircular inscription: Jan II Kazimierz.
Polish Museum in Rapperswil – 130th Anniversary of Foundation
Coin designer: Ewa Olszewska-Borys		Mint: Mennica Polska S.A.	
Value: zł 10	Alloy: Ag 925/1000 (Silver)	Quantity: 25,000 pcs	Quality: Proof
Issued: 18 October 2000	Diameter: 32.00 mm (1.26 in)	Weight: 14.14 g (0.50 oz; 0.45 ozt)	Market value: 130 zł
Obverse: Image of the Eagle as the State Emblem of the Republic of Poland, under the Eagle description: ZŁ 10 ZŁ. On the left side a stylised image of a fragment of Rapperswil Castle, on the right side a stylised image of a fragment of the Royal Castle in Warsaw. Above an inscription: RZECZPOSPOLITA / POLSKA / ROK 2000 (Year 2000). Under the left talon of the Eagle the Mint mark: m/w. Reverse: A stylised image of a fragment of Bar Column: a fragment of shaft, capital, sphere and eagle. On the left side inscription: MAGNA / RES / LIBERTAS and semicircular inscription: MUZEUM POLSKIE (Polish Museum). On the right side inscription: 1870 / 2000 and semicircular inscription: W RAPPERSWILU (in Rapperswil).
30th Anniversary of the December Events in 1970
Coin designer: Ewa Tyc-Karpińska		Mint: Mennica Polska S.A.	
Value: zł 10	Alloy: Ag 925/1000 oxidized (Oxidized Silver)	Quantity: 37,000 pcs	Quality: Proof
Issued: 16 November 2000	Diameter: 32.00 mm (1.26 in)	Weight: 14.14 g (0.50 oz; 0.45 ozt)	Market value: 120 zł
Obverse: On the left side an image of the Eagle as the State Emblem of the Republic of Poland. Centrally, uneven pavement with a stylised image of the emblem of the Republic of Poland on it. Below an inscription: 10 zł. Beneath, a semicircular description: Rzeczpospolita Polska, below the year of emission: 2000. Under the left talon of the Eagle, the Mint mark: m/w. Reverse: Centrally, pavement with stylised figures of people on it. Above, an inscription: 30. rocznica / ' 70 (30th Anniversary / of December ' 70). On the side an inscription: GDAŃSK GDYNIA SZCZECIN ELBLĄG SŁUPSK separated with asterisks.

== See also ==
- Numismatics
- Regular issue coinage
- Coin grading
