= Commemorative coins of Poland: 2007 =

Commemorative coins offered by Poland in the year 2007

Poland has a rich selection of Gold and Silver commemorative coins. In the year 2007 coins were launched in the series: "Animals of the World", "Polish Travelers and Explorers", "History of the Polish Zloty", "Monuments of Material Culture in Poland", "History of the Polish Cavalry", "Polish Painters of the Turn of 19th and 20th Centuries" and various occasional coins.

== Table of contents ==
Animals of the World: Grey seal (lat. Halichoerus grypus)
Reverse designer: Ewa Tyc-Karpińska, Obverse designer: Robert Kotowicz		Mint: Mennica Polska S.A.	
Value: zł 20	Alloy: Ag 925/1000 (Silver)	Quantity: 58,000 pcs	Quality: Proof
Issued: 17 January 2007	Diameter: 38.61 mm (1.52 in)	Weight: 28.28 g (1.00 oz; 0.91 ozt)	Market value: 360 zł
Part of the collection "Animals of the World". Obverse: An image of the Eagle established as the State Emblem of the Republic of Poland. Under the Eagle the notation of the year of issue, 2007, below an inscription, ZŁ 20 ZŁ. The images of the national flag at the sides of the Eagle's legs. At the top, a semicircular inscription, RZECZPOSPOLITA POLSKA. The Mint's mark, under the Eagle's left leg. Reverse: In the central part images of two adult seals and one young seal, and the shade of two seals in the background. Above the stylised sea waves. At the top, a semicircular inscription, FOKA SZARA, at the bottom, a semicircular inscription, Halichoerus grypus.
Polish Travelers & Explorers: Ignacy Domeyko (1802-1889)
Coin designer: Roussanka Nowakowska		Mint: Mennica Polska S.A.	
Value: zł 10	Alloy: Ag 925/1000 (Silver)	Quantity: 55,000 pcs	Quality: Proof
Issued: 6 February 2007	Diameter: 32.00 mm (1.26 in)	Weight: 14.14 g (0.50 oz; 0.45 ozt)	Market value: 75 zł
Obverse: On the left an image of the Eagle established as the state emblem of the Republic of Poland.Above a stylised image of mountains. At the top a semicircular inscription, RZECZPOSPOLITA POLSKA. Under the Eagle the inscription, 10 ZŁ, under the inscription the indication of the year of issue, 2007. On the right side of the Eagle stylised images: a fragment of a technical drawing displaying the instrument to analyse silver, crystal from the table in the mineralogy handbook by Ignacy Domeyko, plants "Domeykoa oppositifolia" and a mussel "Trigonia domeykoana". The Mint's mark, under the Eagle's left leg. Reverse: On the left a stylised image of seated Ignacy Domeyko with an open book. Above on the left and on the right side a stylised image of mountains. On the right side stylised images of the fragments of a geographic grid and the outline of South America. On the right side a semicircular inscription, IGNACY DOMEYKO 1802-1889.
75th Anniversary of Breaking Enigma Codes (gold)
Coin designer: Ewa Tyc-Karpińska		Mint: Mennica Polska S.A.	
Value: zł 100	Alloy: Au 900/1000 (Gold)	Quantity: 8,000 pcs	Quality: Proof
Issued: 21 March 2007	Diameter: 21.00 mm (0.83 in)	Weight: 8 g (0.28 oz; 0.26 ozt)	Market value: 800 zł
Obverse: In the central part, an image of the Eagle established as the state emblem of the Republic of Poland. In the background, tables of letters and an outline of the Enigma cipher machine operation diagram. A semicircular inscription, RZECZPOSPOLITA POLSKA, the notation of the year of issue, 2007 and an inscription, 100 ZŁ. The Mint’s mark, incorporated into the tables of letters, under the Eagle’s left leg. Reverse: On the left and on the right, stylised light bulbs from the Enigma cipher machine, surrounded by two groups of circles reflecting beams of light. At the top, in three rows, letters of the alphabet connected by lines with two rows of letters below. Under the light bulbs, an inscription, 75. ROCZNICA ZŁAMANIA/ SZYFRU ENIGMY (75th anniversary of breaking Enigma codes).
75th Anniversary of Breaking Enigma Codes (silver)
Coin designer: Ewa Tyc-Karpińska		Mint: Mennica Polska S.A.	
Value: zł 10	Alloy: Ag 925/1000 (Silver)	Quantity: 52,000 pcs	Quality: Proof
Issued: 21 March 2007	Diameter: 32.00 mm (1.26 in)	Weight: 14.14 g (0.50 oz; 0.45 ozt)	Market value: 75 zł
Obverse: An image of the Eagle established as the state emblem of the Republic of Poland. Above the Eagle, an inscription, RZECZPOSPOLITA/ POLSKA. In the background, a stylised Enigma cipher machine operation diagram and a stylised inscription, ENIGMA, emerging from the composition of lines. Under the diagram, on the left, the notation of the year of issue, 2007. At the bottom, an inscription, 10 ZŁ. The Mint’s mark under the Eagle’s left leg. Reverse: A stylised labyrinth of connections referring to the operation of the Enigma cipher machine. In the centre, an inscription, ENIGMA. Below, an inscription, 1932, inverted by 180 degrees. In the rim, an inscription, 75. ROCZNICA ZŁAMANIA SZYFRU ENIGMY (75th anniversary of breaking Enigma codes). On the edge: An inscription, MARIAN REJEWSKI, HENRYK ZYGALSKI, JERZY RÓŻYCKI, separated by stars.
History of the Polish Zloty: 5 zloty of 1928 issue (Nike)
Coin designer: Andrzej Nowakowski		Mint: Mennica Polska S.A.	
Value: zł 10	Alloy: Ag 925/1000 (Silver)	Quantity: 52,000 pcs	Quality: Proof
Issued: 18 April 2007	Diameter: 32.00 mm (1.26 in)	Weight: 14.14 g (0.50 oz; 0.45 ozt)	Market value: 100 zł
bverse: On the right-hand side, an image of the obverse of the 5 zl coin of 1928, on the left-hand side, a stylised image of the bust of Nike, with grain ears. Below, an image of the Eagle established as the state emblem of the Republic of Poland. On the right-hand side of the Eagle, an inscription, 10 ZŁ. Above the Eagle, the notation of the year of issue, 2007. At the bottom, a semicircular inscription, RZECZPOSPOLITA POLSKA. Under the Eagle's left leg, the mint's mark: m/w. Reverse: On the right-hand side, an image of the reverse of the 5 zl coin of 1928. In the background, a stylised image of grain ears. On the left-hand side, a semicircular inscription, DZIEJE ZŁOTEGO (History of the Polish Zloty).
750th Anniversary of the granting municipal rights to Kraków (gold)
Coin designer: Robert Kotowicz		Mint: Mennica Polska S.A.	
Value: zł 200	Alloy: Au 900/1000 (Gold)	Quantity: 9,600 pcs	Quality: Proof
Issued: 22 May 2007	Diameter: 27.00 mm (1.06 in)	Weight: 15.50 g (0.55 oz; 0.50 ozt)	Market value: 1300 zł
Obverse: An image of the Eagle established as the State Emblem of the Republic of Poland, in the central part. The notation of the year of issue, 20-07, at the sides of the Eagle. Below the Eagle, a stylised inscription, ZŁ 20O ZŁ, on the background of an image of a fragment of Kraków incorporation charter in Latin. In the rim, a semicircular stylised inscription, RZECZPOSPOLITA POLSKA. The Mint's mark, m/w, under the Eagle's left leg. Reverse: On the left, the stylised image of Prince Boleslaw the Shy as painted by Jan Matejko. On the right, a stylised image of the Prince's seal and the first words from the incorporation charter of Kraków in Latin. Under the image of the Prince, a stylised inscription, 750-LECIE (750th anniversary), and on the left side a stylised semicircular inscription, LOKACJI KRAKOWA (of the incorporation of Kraków).
750th Anniversary of the granting municipal rights to Kraków (silver)
Coin designer: Robert Kotowicz		Mint: Mennica Polska S.A.	
Value: zł 10	Alloy: Ag 925/1000 (Silver)	Quantity: 58,000 pcs	Quality: Proof
Issued: 22 May 2007	Diameter: 32.00 mm (1.26 in)	Weight: 14.14 g (0.50 oz; 0.45 ozt)	Market value: 75 zł
Obverse: On the right, an image of the Eagle established as the State Emblem of the Republic of Poland, on the background of a stylised image of a part of the Barbican. In the central part, an image of the Florian Gate and the notation of the year of issue, 2007, on the left. In the rim, a semicircular stylised inscription, RZECZPOSPOLITA POLSKA which begins and ends with small Xs. At the bottom, a stylised inscription, ZŁ 10 ZŁ. The Mint's mark, m/w, under the Eagle's left leg. Reverse: In the central part, stylised images of the seal of Prince Boleslaw the Shy and the first words from the incorporation charter of Kraków in Latin. In the rim, a semicircular stylised inscription, 750-LECIE LOKACJI KRAKOWA (750th anniversary of the incorporation of Kraków)
Monuments of Material Culture in Poland: Medieval Town of Toruń
Coin designer: Andrzej Nowakowski		Mint: Mennica Polska S.A.	
Value: zł 20	Alloy: Ag 925/1000 (Silver)	Quantity: 56,000 pcs	Quality: Proof
Issued: 21 June 2007	Diameter: 38.61 mm (1.52 in)	Weight: 28.28 g (1.00 oz; 0.91 ozt)	Market value: 100 zł
Obverse: At the bottom an image of the Eagle established as the State Emblem of the Republic of Poland. On the right-hand side of the Eagle the notation of the year of issue, 2007, on the left-hand side of the Eagle an inscription, 20/ZŁ. Above the Eagle an image of the Bridge Gate and - on the right - a stylised image of Torun's historic coat of arms. At the top, a semicircular inscription, RZECZPOSPOLITA POLSKA. The Mint's mark, m/w, under the Eagle's left leg. Reverse: Stylised images: on the left-hand side - of the Old Town Hall in Torun, on the right - of a fragment of the Artus Court, and at the back of the Cathedral Basilica of St. John the Baptist and St. John the Evangelist in Torun. At the top, a semicircular inscription, MIASTO ŚREDNIOWIECZNE W TORUNIU (Medieval town in Torun).
Polish Travelers & Explorers: Henryk Arctowski & Antoni Bolesław Dobrowolski
Coin designer: Andrzej Nowakowski		Mint: Mennica Polska S.A.	
Value: zł 10	Alloy: Ag 925/1000 (Silver)	Quantity: 57,000 pcs	Quality: Proof
Issued: 19 September 2007	Diameter: 32.00 mm (1.26 in)	Weight: 14.14 g (0.50 oz; 0.45 ozt)	Market value: 180 zł
Obverse: On the right, an image of the Eagle established as the State Emblem of the Republic of Poland. Below the Eagle an inscription, 10 ZŁ. At the top, a semicircular inscription, RZECZPOSPOLITA POLSKA, and on the left, diagonally below the inscription, the notation of the year of issue, 2007. To the left from the Eagle, a stylised "Belgica" ship image, below, a stylised iceberg image and an ice-imitating zirconia. The Mint's mark, m/w, under the Eagle's left leg. Reverse: Images of the busts of Henryk Arctowski and Antoni B. Dobrowolski. At the bottom, on the left, the image of the Antarctic continent. At the top, a stylised image of an iceberg. In the rim, an inscription, HENRYK ARCTOWSKI 1871-1958, a stylised image of Henryk Arctowski Polish Antarctic Station logo and an inscription, ANTONI B. DOBROWOLSKI 1872-1954.
125th Anniversary of Karol Szymanowski's Birth 1882-1937 (gold)
Coin designer: Urszula Walerzak		Mint: Mennica Polska S.A.	
Value: zł 200	Alloy: Au 900/1000 (Gold)	Quantity: 8,000 pcs	Quality: Proof
Issued: 3 October 2007	Diameter: 27.00 mm (1.06 in)	Weight: 15.50 g (0.55 oz; 0.50 ozt)	Market value: 1250 zł
Obverse: An image of the Eagle established as the State Emblem of the Republic of Poland. Above the Eagle, a stylised image of a score. In the rim, a semicircular inscription, RZECZPOSPOLITA POLSKA and in the rim, the notation of the year of issue, 20-07. Below the Eagle, an inscription, 200 ZŁ.Between the beginning and the end of the inscription - a dot. The Mint's mark, m/w, under the Eagle's left leg. Reverse: An image of Karol Szymanowski on the background of a stylised image of a score. On the right, an inscription, 1882/1937. In the rim, a semicircular inscription, 125. ROCZNICA URODZIN KAROLA SZYMANOWSKIEGO. Between the beginning and the end of the inscription - a dot.
125th Anniversary of Karol Szymanowski's Birth 1882-1937 (silver)
Coin designer: Urszula Walerzak		Mint: Mennica Polska S.A.	
Value: zł 10	Alloy: Ag 925/1000 (Silver)	Quantity: 53,000 pcs	Quality: Proof
Issued: 3 October 2007	Diameter: 32.00 mm (1.26 in)	Weight: 14.14 g (0.50 oz; 0.45 ozt)	Market value: 100 zł
Obverse: An image of the Eagle established as the State Emblem of the Republic of Poland, on the background of a stylised image of a score. Below the Eagle, an inscription, 10 ZŁ. On the left, a fragment of a piano keyboard. In the rim, a semicircular inscription, RZECZPOSPOLITA POLSKA and the notation of the year of issue, 20-07. Between the beginning and the end of the inscription - a dot. The Mint's mark, m/w, under the Eagle's left leg. Reverse: The stylised images of the bust of Karol Szymanowski and a score incorporated into the figure. On the left, an inscription, 1882 or an inscription, 1937 can be seen depending on the tilt angle. In the rim, a semicircular inscription, 125. ROCZNICA URODZIN KAROLA SZYMANOWSKIEGO. Between the beginning and the end of the inscription - a dot.
History of the Polish Cavalry: The Mounted Knight - 15th Century (gold)
Coin designer: Roussanka Nowakowska		Mint: Mennica Polska S.A.	
Value: zł 200	Alloy: Au 900/1000 (Gold)	Quantity: 9,900 pcs	Quality: Proof
Issued: 24 October 2007	Diameter: 27.00 mm (1.06 in)	Weight: 15.50 g (0.55 oz; 0.50 ozt)	Market value: 1400 zł
Obverse: On the right-hand side, image of the Eagle established as the State Emblem of the Republic of Poland. Below the Eagle, an inscription, 200/ZŁ. On the left-hand side of the Eagle, above, the notation of the year of issue, 2007. Below, the stylized images of: helmet, two swords, lance, glove and a pennant. At the bottom a semicircular inscription, RZECZPOSPOLITA POLSKA. The Mint’s mark, m/w, under the Eagle’s left leg. Reverse: A stylised image of a heavy armoured mounted horseman with the bared sword. On the left-hand side a stylised image of urban edifices. At the bottom and on the right hand side a semicircular inscription, RYCERZ CIĘŻKOZBROJNY (heavy armoured mounted horseman) – XV w.
History of the Polish Cavalry: The Mounted Knight - 15th Century (silver)
Coin designer: Roussanka Nowakowska		Mint: Mennica Polska S.A.	
Value: zł 10	Alloy: Ag 925/1000 (Silver)	Quantity: 61,000 pcs	Quality: Proof
Issued: 24 October 2007	Dimensions: length: 22.00 mm (0.87 in) width: 32.00 mm (1.26 in)	Weight: 14.14 g (0.50 oz; 0.45 ozt)	Market value: 100 zł
Obverse: An image of the Eagle established as the State Emblem of the Republic of Poland. Above the Eagle, a chivalric helmet and a floral ornament around the Eagle and helmet. Below the Eagle on the right-hand side an inscription, 10/ZŁ, on the left-hand side oblique image of the sword. Below the sword the notation of the year of issue, 2007. On the left-hand side a vertical inscription, RZECZPOSPOLITA, at the bottom an inscription, POLSKA. The Mint’s mark, m/w, under the Eagle’s left leg. Reverse: Stylised images of: a heavy armoured mounted horseman with the lance, and an outline of a mounted knight with the bare sword in the background. At the top, on the right-hand side, the outline of urban edifices. At the bottom, below a broken line, an inscription, RYCERZ/CIĘŻKOZBROJNY (heavy armoured mounted horseman), above the line on the right-hand side an inscription, XV w
Polish Painters of the Turn of 19th & 20th Centuries: Leon Wyczółkowski (1852-1936)
Coin designer: Ewa Olszewska–Borys		Mint: Mennica Polska S.A.	
Value: zł 20	Alloy: Ag 925/1000 (Silver) and pad prints: red, yellow, green and blue	Quantity: 56,000 pcs	Quality: Proof
Issued: 5 December 2007	Dimensions: length: 40.00 mm (1.57 in) width: 28.00 mm (1.10 in)	Weight: 14.14 g (0.50 oz; 0.45 ozt)	Market value: 150 zł
Obverse: A stylized image of the painting ”Rogalin zimą” (Rogalin in Winter) by Leon Wyczółkowski, 1925.At the bottom, on the right-hand side, image of the Eagle established as the State Emblem of the Republic of Poland. Around the Eagle an inscription, 20 zł, a separating dot, an inscription, RZECZPOSPOLITA POLSKA, and the notation of the year of issue, 2007. The Mint’s mark, m/w, under the Eagle’s left leg. Reverse: An image of Leon Wyczółkowski, in accordance with the self-portrait of 1927. In the left-hand bottom corner, a palette and three paint brushes. On the palette paints: red, yellow, green and blue. On the left-hand side and above an inscription, LEON WYCZÓŁKOWSKI, on the right-hand side a vertical inscription, 1852–1936.
Konrad Korzeniowski/Joseph Conrad (gold)
Coin designer: Robert Kotowicz		Mint: Mennica Polska S.A.	
Value: zł 200	Alloy: Au 900/1000 (Gold)	Quantity: 8,200 pcs	Quality: Proof
Issued: 20 December 2007	Diameter: 27.00 mm (1.06 in)	Weight: 15.50 g (0.55 oz; 0.50 ozt)	Market value: 1380 zł
Obverse: On the left-hand side, an image of the Eagle established as the State Emblem of the Republic of Poland. On the right-hand side of the Eagle stylized images of the barque named the Otago and of an open book with the pages whose bottom edges are shaped to look like sea waves. At the top, in the rim, a semicircular inscription, RZECZPOSPOLITA POLSKA and the notation of the year of issue, 2007. At the top, on the left-hand side an inscription, 200/ZŁ. The Mint’s mark, m/w, under the Eagle’s left leg. Reverse: An image of Joseph Conrad, on its right-hand side an inscription, 1857-1924. Below an inscription, JOSEPH CONRAD, against the background of the stylized facsimile of his signature. In the rim on the left-hand side a semicircular inscription, KONRAD KORZENIOWSKI.
Konrad Korzeniowski/Joseph Conrad (silver)
Coin designer: Robert Kotowicz		Mint: Mennica Polska S.A.	
Value: zł 10	Alloy: Ag 925/1000 (Silver), hologram	Quantity: 59,000 pcs	Quality: Proof
Issued: 20 December 2007	Diameter: 32.00 mm (1.26 in)	Weight: 14.14 g (0.50 oz; 0.45 ozt)	Market value: 100 zł
Obverse: On the right-hand side, at the bottom an image of the Eagle established as the State Emblem of the Republic of Poland. On the left-hand side at the top, an image of Joseph Conrad, on the right-hand side, an inscription, KONRAD/KORZENIOWSKI/1857-1924, an oblique facsimile of his signature below. On the right-hand side, an inscription, 10/ZŁ, the notation of the year of issue, 2007, below. On the left-hand side, in the rim, a semicircular inscription, RZECZPOSPOLITA POLSKA. The Mint’s mark, m/w, under the Eagle’s left leg. Reverse: A stylized image of the barque named the Otago and a stylized image of clouds above. Below, a hologram shows the reflection of the barque in water and changes colours depending on the angle of vision.

== See also ==
- Numismatics
- Regular issue coinage
- Coin grading
