= Commemorative coins of Poland: 2005 =

Commemorative coins offered by Poland in the year 2005

Poland has a rich selection of gold and silver commemorative coins. In the year 2005 coins were launched in the series: "Polish Kings and Princes", "Animals of the World", "History of the Polish Zloty" and "Polish Painters of the Turn of 19th and 20th Centuries" and various occasional coins.

== Table of contents ==
Mikołaj Rej (1505–1569) – 500th Anniversary of the Birth (gold)
Coin designer: Ewа Olszewska-Borys		Mint: Mennica Polska S.A.	
Value: zł 200	Alloy: Au 900/1000 (gold)	Quantity: 3,600 pcs	Quality: Proof
Issued: 20 January 2005	Diameter: 27.00 mm (1.06 in)	Weight: 15.50 g (0.55 oz; 0.50 ozt)	Market value: 1.900 zł
Obverse: Stylised goose quill pen located diagonally in the centre. Image of the eagle, established as the state emblem of the Republic of Poland, and the circumscription, RZECZPOSPOLITA POLSKA and notation of the year of issue, 2005, above and left. Inscription, 200/ ZŁ, on the right-hand side. Facsimile of Mikołaj Rej's signature, below. The Mint's mark, m/w, under the eagle's left leg. Reverse: Bust of Mikołaj Rej with fragments of architecture in the background. Circumscription: 1505 on the left, 1569 on the right. Inscription: 500. ROCZNICA/ URODZIN/ MIKOŁAJA/REJA underneath the bust.
Mikołaj Rej (1505–1569) – 500th Anniversary of the Birth (silver)
Coin designer: Ewa Olszewska-Borys		Mint: Mennica Polska S.A.	
Value: zł 10	Alloy: Ag 925/1000 (silver)	Quantity: 60,000 pcs	Quality: Proof
Issued: 20 January 2005	Diameter: 32.00 mm (1.26 in)	Weight: 14.14 g (0.50 oz; 0.45 ozt)	Market value: 60 zł
Obverse: In an oval: an image of the eagle, established as the state emblem of the Republic of Poland and an inscription: 10, underneath the eagle. Inscription in the rim: RZECZPOSPOLITA POLSKA, and notation of the year of issue: 2005, preceded and followed by a dot, and an inscription: ZŁOTYCH. The Mint's mark, m/w, under the eagle's left leg. Reverse: Portrait of Mikołaj Rej in an oval. Inscription surrounding the portrait: 500. ROCZNICA URODZIN MIKOŁAJA REJA 1505–1569, separated by dots.
Polish Kings and Princes: August II the Strong (1697–1706, 1709–1733)
Coin designer: Ewa Tyc-Karpińska		Mint: Mennica Polska S.A.	
Value: zł 100	Alloy: Au 900/1000 (gold)	Quantity: 4,200 pcs	Quality: Proof
Issued: 22 February 2005	Diameter: 21.00 mm (0.83 in)	Weight: 8.00 g (0.28 oz; 0.26 ozt)	Market value: 2.000zł
Obverse: Image of the eagle, established as the state emblem of the Republic of Poland. Notation of the year of issue, 2005, on the eagle's sides. Inscription: ZŁ 100 ZŁ, below the eagle. Inscription: RZECZPOSPOLITA POLSKA, in the rim. The Mint's mark, m/w, under the eagle's left leg. Reverse: Bust of the King August II Mocny. Inscription in the rim, AUGUST II MOCNY, above; 1697–1706 1709–1733, below.
Polish Kings and Princes: August II the Strong (1697–1706, 1709–1733)
Coin designer: Ewa Tyc-Karpińska		Mint: Mennica Polska S.A.	
Value: zł 10	Alloy: Ag 925/1000 (silver)	Quantity: 61,000 pcs	Quality: Proof
Issued: 22 February 2005	Diameter: 32.00 mm (1.26 in)	Weight: 14.14 g (0.50 oz; 0.45 ozt)	Market value: 60zł
Obverse: Image of the eagle, established as the state emblem of the Republic of Poland. Notation of the year of issue, 2005, on the eagle's sides. Inscription: ZŁ 10 ZŁ, below the eagle. Inscription: RZECZPOSPOLITA POLSKA, in the rim, preceded and followed with five pearls. The Mint's mark, m/w, under the eagle's left leg. Reverse: Half-figure of King August II Mocny. Inscription in a semicircle, AUGUST II MOCNY, on the left side; inscription in a semicircle, 1697–1706 1709–1733, on the right side.
Animals of the World: eagle owl (Bubo bubo)
Obverse designer: Ewa Tyc-Karpińska; Reverse designer: Andrzej Nowakowski		Mint: Mennica Polska S.A.	
Value: zł 20	Alloy: Ag 925/1000 (silver)	Quantity: 61,000 pcs	Quality: Proof
Issued: 15 March 2005	Diameter: 38.61 mm (1.52 in)	Weight: 28.28 g (1.00 oz; 0.91 ozt)	Market value: 350zł
Obverse: Image of the eagle, established as the state emblem of the Republic of Poland. Notation of the year of issue: 2005, and inscription: ZŁ 20 ZŁ, below the eagle. Images of the national flag by the sides of eagle's legs. At the top inscription in a semicircle: RZECZPOSPOLITA POLSKA. The Mint's mark, m/w, under the eagle's left leg. Reverse: Images of an adult eagle owl and three nestling in a nest in a pine tree. At the top inscription in a semicircle, PUCHACZ – Bubo bubo.
An International Exhibition EXPO 2005 Japan (gold)
Coin designer: Robert Kotowicz		Mint: Mennica Polska S.A.	
Value: zl 200	Alloy: Au 900/1000 (gold)	Quantity: 4,200 pcs	Quality: Proof
Issued: 23 March 2005	Diameter: 27.00 mm (1.06 in)	Weight: 15.50 g (0.55 oz; 0.50 ozt)	Market value:
Obverse: A stylised view of a fragment of the monument to Fryderyk Chopin from the Royal Łazienki Park in Warsaw. Below, on the left-hand side, an image of the eagle, established as the state emblem of the Republic of Poland. Above the eagle, on the left-hand side, an inscription: 200 ZŁ. On the left-hand side, circumscribed, the notation of the year of issue: 2005. Below, a circumscription: RZECZPOSPOLITA POLSKA. The Mint's mark, m/w, under the eagle's left leg. Reverse: Stylised views of the Nagoya Castle with the Fuji Mountain in the background and of a branch of a blossoming plum-tree. Above, an inscription: EXPO / 2005 / AICHI.
An International Exhibition EXPO 2005 Japan (silver)
Coin designer: Robert Kotowicz		Mint: Mennica Polska S.A.	
Value: zl 10	Alloy: Ag 925/1000 (silver)	Quantity: 80,000 pcs	Quality: Proof
Issued: 23 March 2005	Length: 43.40 mm (1.71 in); Height: 29.20 mm (1.15 in); Fan-shaped at a dilation angle of 100°	Weight: 14.40 g (0.51 oz; 0.46 ozt)	Market value:
Obverse: A stylised view of a fragment of the monument to Fryderyk Chopin from the Royal Łazienki Park in Warsaw. An image of the eagle, established as the state emblem of the Republic of Poland, on the left-hand side, and an inscription: RZECZPOSPOLITA POLSKA along the left edge. Notation of the year of issue: 2005 and an inscription: 10 ZŁ along the right edge. The Mint's mark, m/w, under the eagle's left leg. Reverse: A view of a pair of cranes. On the left-hand side, a view of a pine tree and an inscription: EXPO along the left edge. An inscription: 2005 AICHI along the right edge of the coin.

== See also ==
- Numismatics
- Regular issue coinage
- Coin grading
