= St. John's Eve (play) =

St. John's Eve, (Danish-Norwegian: Sancthansnatten) is a play written by Henrik Ibsen and first performed in 1853. The play is considered apocryphal, because it never entered Ibsen's collected works. It was poorly received at its premiere at Den Nationale Scene in Bergen in 1853.

== Plot summary ==
The play takes place during a midsummer feast on a valley farm in Telemark. Here, we find two very different attitudes symbolized in the old farm house and a new house. The farm house is inhabited by the old farmer, Berg, and his granddaughter Anne. The new house is inhabited by Anne's stepmother, Mrs. Berg, and her daughter from a previous marriage, Juliane. At the time of the play, Anne's father is dead, and there is a big question as to what will come of his inheritance. The second Mrs. Berg wishes for her daughter to inherit the farm and has found her a suitor from town, Johannes Birk. He arrives with Juliane's brother Jørgen, and a fellow student, Julian Paulsen. The young ones assemble for a trip to the hill of St. John (Sankthanshaugen), to take part in the revels of rural festivity. Jørgen prepares the punch, but the people are not aware of the nisse, who lives in the attic of the old house. He mixes the liquor with a mystical flower, with the virtue of remembrance for those who have forgotten their past.

The young ones wander away after tasting the liquor. Anne walks with Birk, Julian with Juliane. As the night wears on, elves dance in the forest, and Anne finds a flower, in Norwegian called "Keys of St. Mary". With this, she orders the mountain to open, and the couples witness a play within a play, an old ballad about a girl who was abducted into the mountain by the mountain king and drank a cup of forgetfulness. Anne, who was brought up on old folklore and songs, recognizes the verses. She is surprised to learn that Birk knows them too. Paulsen, on the other hand, interprets the mountain king as a "Fine gentleman of the upper classes", from his own town.

After this play, Anne recognizes Birk as her childhood friend, and Julian recognizes Juliane from a dancing school in the city. The day after, the "right" couples decide to engage, which disrupts Mrs. Berg's plans of ruling the farm through Birk. The flower Anne found has turned into a real key, and with this, her grandfather opens a box containing her father's will, long lost. This states her rightful inheritance when marrying, and Mrs. Berg is beaten in the end. Anne marries Birk, Julian marries Juliane and all are happy about the change in plans. The real winner is the nisse, who planned it all from behind.

== Reception and criticism ==
The comical figure of Julian Paulsen was at the time a satirical comment on the regular urban romantic, such as Johan Sebastian Welhaven. Julian is a romantic nationalist, pining for the hulder in the Norwegian forests. He is heartbroken because the fairy tales edited by Asbjørnsen and Moe claimed that hulders have a cow's tail. The editors, Julian states, are "inhuman" because of this.

Ibsen, through some of the protagonists, seems to think Julian is far from the truth of both folklore and rural life, and as the play goes on, we learn that he is unable to tolerate the farmers at all. The satire was clear, and the public reacted with scorn. They felt offended, and the play was not well received. Ibsen himself stated that the whole gang of critics thought like Julian and decided not to offend them again. Therefore, St. John's Eve was never printed in his "collected works", and not performed again until 1978, under the supervision of Ingeborg Refling Hagen. Since then, it has been played by youth theater groups and children alike, and only twice by an adult commercial theater.

== Themes ==
The play takes into account variations of romantic nationalism in Norway. On the one side, represented by Julian, there is the naive and unrealistic idea of "nature" and "originality", or even "primitive life", seen from a safe urban setting. On the other hand, there is the more realistic view of the country and the Norwegian farm culture. The first view is presented as arrogant, the other as humble. Some of the themes are inspired by similar plays written by Henrik Wergeland and are used again fully in Peer Gynt.

The play relies on many sources, including A Midsummer Night's Dream by William Shakespeare. Ibsen takes a lot of plot devices from Shakespeare's play: Puck (the nisse), the flower, the confusion of couples, the elves, and even the summer night itself. Like Puck, the nisse in the play has the epilogue.

Further, Ibsen alludes to Norwegian folk tales, and ballads of abduction.
