= Commemorative coins of Poland: 2008 =

Commemorative coins offered by Poland in the year 2008

Poland has a rich selection of Gold and Silver commemorative coins. In the year 2008 coins were launched in the series: "Animals of the World", "Monuments of Material Culture in Poland" (previously "Castles and Palaces in Poland"), "Polish Painters of the Turn of 19th and 20th Centuries", "The Polish Calendar of Traditional Customs and Rituals", "History of the Polish Zloty", and various occasional coins.

== Table of contents ==
Animals of the World: Peregrine falcon (Falco peregrinus)
Reverse designer: Ewa Tyc-Karpińska, Obverse designer: Roussanka Nowakowska		Mint: Mennica Polska S.A.	
Value: zł 20	Alloy: Ag 925 (Silver)	Quantity: 107,000 pcs	Quality: Proof
Issued: 16 January 2008	Diameter: 38.61 mm (1.52 in)	Weight: 28.28 g (1.00 oz; 0.91 ozt)	Market value: 200 zł
Part of the collection "Animals of the World". Obverse: An image of the eagle established as the State emblem of the Republic of Poland. Under the Eagle, the notation of the year of issue: 2008, below, an inscription, ZŁ 20 ZŁ. The images of the Polish national flag on the sides of the Eagle's legs. At the top, a semicircular inscription, RZECZPOSPOLITA POLSKA. The Mint's mark under the Eagle's left leg, m/w. Reverse: An image of an adult peregrine falcon and two chicks in a nest on a rock. On the right, a stylised image representing a fragment of a mountain range. At the top, a semicircular inscription, SOKÓŁ WĘDROWNY – Falco peregrinus.
40th Anniversary of March 1968
Coin designer: Andrzej Nowakowski		Mint: Mennica Polska S.A.	
Value: zł 10	Alloy: Ag 925 (Silver)	Quantity: 118,000 pcs	Quality: Proof
Issued: 3 March 2008	Diameter: 32 mm (1.26 in)	Weight: 14.14 g (0.50 oz; 0.45 ozt)	Market value: 160 zł
Obverse: On the right-hand side, an image of the Eagle established as the State Emblem of the Republic of Poland. On the right-hand side at the top, a semicircular inscription, RZECZPOSPOLITA POLSKA. Below the Eagle, on the right-hand-side, the notation of the year of issue, 2008. Below, the images of an open book on top of a closed book. On the left-hand side, the stylised images of falling book pages. The Mint's mark, m/w, under the Eagle's right leg. Reverse: A stylised image of the main entrance gate of the University of Warsaw. Below, a stylised flag symbolizing the Polish national flag and stylised images of banners. At the top, a semicircular inscription, 40. ROCZNICA MARCA `68 (40th anniversary of March ‘68 events). At the bottom, the stylised images of militiamen and protesting students.
Siberian exiles (gold)
Coin designer: Ewa Tyc-Karpińska		Mint: Mennica Polska S.A.	
Value: zł 100	Alloy: Au 900/1000 (Gold)	Quantity: 12,000 pcs	Quality: Proof
Issued: 26 March 2008	Diameter: 21 mm (0.83 in)	Weight: 8 g (0.28 oz; 0.26 ozt)	Market value: 800 zł
Obverse: On the left-hand side, an image of the Eagle established as the State Emblem of the Republic of Poland. On the right- hand side, human figures silhouetted against the tree trunks. On the right-hand side, a vertical inscription, 100 ZŁ. On the left-hand side and at the bottom, in the rim, a semicircular inscription, RZECZPOSPOLITA POLSKA, and the notation of the year of issue, 2008. The Mint's mark, m/w, under the Eagle's left leg. Reverse: The stylised images of an old woman and a girl on the right-hand side, and of a fragment of a hut with a visible window on the left-hand side, separated by a stylised image of a tree trunk. On the right-hand side, a semicircular inscription, SYBIRACY (Siberian exiles).
Siberian exiles (silver)
Coin designer: Ewa Tyc-Karpińska		Mint: Mennica Polska S.A.	
Value: zł 10	Alloy: Ag 925/1000 (Silver)	Quantity: 135,000 pcs	Quality: Proof
Issued: 26 March 2008	Diameter: 32 mm (1.26 in)	Weight: 14.14 g (0.50 oz; 0.45 ozt)	Market value: 100 zł
Obverse: On the left-hand side, an image of the Eagle established as the State Emblem of the Republic of Poland. In the cen- tral part and on the right-hand side, the images of human figures. On the right-hand side, a diagonal inscription, ... bylismy tlumem bezimiennym (... we were a nameless crowd). At the bottom, on the right-hand side, an inscription, 10 ZŁ. On the left-hand side and at the top, in the rim, a semicircular inscription, RZECZPOSPOLITA POLSKA, and the notation of the year of issue, 2008. The Mint's mark, m/w, under the Eagle's left leg. Reverse: In the central part, an inscription, SYBIRACY (Siberian exiles). In the background, a stylised image of the woods and its reflection. At the bottom, a zirconia stone.
65th Anniversary of Warsaw Ghetto Uprising (gold)
Coin designer: Urszula Walerzak		Mint: Mennica Polska S.A.	
Value: zł 200	Alloy: Au 900/1000 (Gold)	Quantity: 12,000 pcs	Quality: Proof
Issued: 15 April 2008	Diameter: 27 mm (1.06 in)	Weight: 15.50 g (0.55 oz; 0.50 ozt)	Market value:
Obverse: Reverse:
65th Anniversary of Warsaw Ghetto Uprising (silver)
Coin designer: Urszula Walerzak		Mint: Mennica Polska S.A.	
Value: zł 20	Alloy: Ag 925/1000 (Silver)	Quantity: 145,000 pcs	Quality: Proof
Issued: 15 April 2008	Diameter: 38.61 mm (1.52 in)	Weight: 28.28 g (1.00 oz; 0.91 ozt)	Market value: 120 zł
Obverse: Reverse:
Zbigniew Herbert (1924 - 1998) (gold)
Coin designer: Dominika Karpińska-Kopiec		Mint: Mennica Polska S.A.	
Value: zł 200	Alloy: Au 900/1000 (Gold)	Quantity: 11,200 pcs	Quality: Proof
Issued: 30 May 2008	Diameter: 27 mm (1.06 in)	Weight: 15.50 g (0.55 oz; 0.50 ozt)	Market value:
Obverse: On the left-hand side, an image of the Eagle established as the State Emblem of the Republic of Poland. On the right-hand side, the half-figure of Zbigniew Herbert. In the rim, a semicircular inscription, RZECZPOSPOLITA POLSKA and the notation of the year of issue, 2008 plus an inscription, 1924-1998 ZBIGNIEW HERBERT. Below, in the centre, a vertical inscription, 200 ZŁ. The Mint's mark, m/w, under the Eagle's left leg. Reverse: Stylised image of a fragment of a mounted statue of Marcus Aurelius. On the left-hand side and above a circumscription, DO MARKA AURELEGO / TO MARCUS AURELIUS. Photograph of Z. Herbert used in the coin design by Isolde Ohlbaum.
Zbigniew Herbert (1924 - 1998) (silver)
Coin designer: Dominika Karpińska-Kopiec		Mint: Mennica Polska S.A.	
Value: zł 10	Alloy: Ag 925/1000 (Silver)	Quantity: 113,000 pcs	Quality: Proof
Issued: 30 May 2008	Diameter: 32 mm (1.26 in)	Weight: 14.14 g (0.50 oz; 0.45 ozt)	Market value:
Obverse: On the right-hand side, an image of the Eagle established as the State Emblem of the Republic of Poland. On the left-hand side, the half-figure of Zbigniew Herbert. In the rim, an inscription, ZBIGNIEW HERBERT 1924-1998 RZECZPOSPOLITA POLSKA and the notation of the year of issue, 2008. Below, in the centre, a vertical inscription, 10 ZŁ. The Mint's mark, m/w, under the Eagle's left leg. Reverse: Stylised image of the Nike of Samothrace statue against the background of a bent silhouette of Zbigniew Herbert with a double outline of the head. On the right-hand side, a semicircular inscription, NIKE KTÓRA SIĘ WAHA / NIKE WHO HESITATES. Photograph of Z. Herbert used in the coin design by Danuta Łomaczewska.
Monuments of Material Culture in Poland Kazimierz Dolny
Coin designer: Ewa Olszewska-Borys		Mint: Mennica Polska S.A.	
Value: zł 20	Alloy: Ag 925/1000 (Silver)	Quantity: 125,000 pcs	Quality: Proof
Issued: 19 June 2008	Diameter: 38.61 mm (1.52 in)	Weight: 28.28 g (1.00 oz; 0.91 ozt)	Market value:
Obverse: At the top of the coin, in the middle, an image of the eagle established as the State Emblem of the republic of Poland. underneath the eagle, on the right-hand side, an inscription, 20 ZL, on the left-hand side, a stylised image of a wall coping fragment of the Celej family tenement in Kazimierz Dolny. At the top and on the right-hand side, a semicircular inscription, RZECZPOSPOLITA POLSKA and the notation of the year of issue, 2008. The Mint's mark under the eagle's left leg, m/w. Reverse: on the left-hand side, stylised images: of a shingle-roofed well and of roofs of the houses by the marketplace in Kazimierz Dolny. In the centre, a stylised image of part of the parish church. At the top, a semicircular inscription, KAZIMIERZ DOLNY.
XXIXth Olympic Games - Beijing 2008 (gold)
Coin designer: Robert Kotowicz		Mint: Mennica Polska S.A.	
Value: zł 200	Alloy: Au 900/1000 (Gold, angle effect)	Quantity: 13,500 pcs	Quality: Proof
Issued: 23 July 2008	Diameter: 27.00 mm (1.06 in)	Weight: 15.50 g (0.55 oz; 0.50 ozt)	Market value:
Obverse: On the right-hand side an image of the Eagle established as the State Emblem of the Republic of Poland. Below the Eagle the notation of the year of issue, 2008. Above the Eagle stylised images of two Chinese kites. At the left-hand side of the Eagle and below – stylised ribbons of kites. At the top on the left-hand side a stylised image of an element of Chinese ornamentation or the Polish Olympic Committee logo visible depending on the angle of sight. In the rim at the bottom a circumscription, RZECZPOSPOLITA POLSKA, and a circumscription, 200 ZŁ. The Mint's mark under the Eagle's left leg: m/w. Reverse: In the centre a stylised image of female pole vault jumper. On the left-hand side an inscription, BEIJING/2008. In the background above and at the left-hand side a stylised image of the silhouettes of a Chinese pagoda. Below in the rim, an inscription, POLSKA REPREZENTACJA OLIMPIJSKA (Polish Olympic Representation).
XXIXth Olympic Games - Beijing 2008 (sphere)
Coin designer: Robert Kotowicz		Mint: Mennica Polska S.A.	
Value: zł 10	Alloy: Ag 925/1000, and an Au 1000/1000–plated duraluminium sphere	Quantity: 140,000 pcs	Quality: Proof
Issued: 23 July 2008	Diameter: 32.00 mm (1.26 in)	Weight: 14.14 g (0.50 oz; 0.45 ozt)	Market value:
Obverse: Below an image of the Eagle established as the State Emblem of the Republic of Poland. At the sides of the Eagle the notation of the year issue, 2008. In the central part a golden sphere with the stylised image of Chinese ornament against the background of a stylised image of the dragon from the Nine Dragons Wall. A semicircular inscription above, RZECZPOSPOLITA POLSKA, below on the right-hand side an inscription, 10/ZŁ. The Mint's mark under the Eagle's left leg: m/w. Reverse: In the central part of the coin a golden sphere with a stylised Polish Olympic Committee logo against of a background of the stylised image of water. Above the sphere a stylised image of the crawl swimmer. Below the sphere an inscription, Beijing / 2008. In the rim an inscription, POLSKA REPREZENTACJA OLIMPIJSKA (Polish Olympic Representation).
XXIXth Olympic Games - Beijing 2008 (square hole)
Coin designer: Urszula Walerzak		Mint: Mennica Polska S.A.	
Value: zł 10	Alloy: Ag 925/1000 (Silver)	Quantity: 150,000 pcs	Quality: Proof
Issued: 23 July 2008	Diameter: 32.00 mm (1.26 in)	Weight: 14.14 g (0.50 oz; 0.45 ozt)	Market value:
Obverse: At the top, an image of the Eagle established as the State Emblem of the Republic of Poland. In the central part of the coin a square hole. At its left-hand side an inscription, 10, at its right-hand side an inscription, ZŁ. In the rim an inscription, RZECZPOSPOLITA POLSKA, and the notation of the year issue, 2008. Below a stylised image of a fragment of the Forbidden City in Beijing and below the Polish Olympic Committee logo. The Mint's mark under the Eagle's left leg: m/w. Reverse: In the central part of the coin a square hole. On the left-hand side a stylised image of a competitor on a windsurfboard. Below the hole an inscription, POLSKA / REPREZENTACJA / OLIMPIJSKA / PEKIN / 2008 (Polish / Olympic / Representation / Beijing / 2008). In the background a stylised image of water waves and an outline of land.
Polish Travellers and Explorers: Bronisław Piłsudski (1866-1918)
Coin designer: Roussanka Nowakowska		Mint: Mennica Polska S.A.	
Value: zł 10	Alloy: Ag 925/1000 (Silver)	Quantity: 99,000 pcs	Quality: Proof
Issued: 1 October 2008	Diameter: 32.00 mm (1.26 in)	Weight: 14.14 g (0.50 oz; 0.45 ozt)	Market value:
Obverse: on the left-hand side, an image of the Eagle established as the State Emblem of the republic of Poland. In the middle, images of a man and a woman holding a child in her arms, in Ainu costume, against the background of stylised images of mountains. on the right-hand side and vertically, a stylised fragment of an ornament from Ainu costume. Below the figures and in the centre, an inscription: 10 zł; on the right-hand side, notation of the year of issue: 2008; on the left-hand side, a stylised fragment of an ornament from Ainu costume. At the top and on the right-hand side, a semi-circular inscription: RZECZPOSPOLITA POLSKA. The Mint's mark under the Eagle's left leg: m/w. Reverse: A stylised image of Bronisław Piłsudski's bust. On the left-hand side, a stylised fragment of an ornament from Ainu costume. on the right-hand side and vertically, an inscription: BRONISŁAW/PIŁSUDSKI, and a horizontal inscription: 1866-/-1918. Underneath, a stylised image of a pine tree.
90th Anniversary of Regaining Independence by Poland
Coin designer: Ewa Olszewska-Borys		Mint: Mennica Polska S.A.	
Value: zł 200	Alloy: Au 900/1000 (Gold)	Quantity: 10,000 pcs	Quality: Proof
Issued: 1 November 2008	Diameter: 27.00 mm (1.06 in)	Weight: 15.50 g (0.55 oz; 0.50 ozt)	Market value:
Obverse: At the top in the central part of the coin an image of the Eagle established as the State Emblem of the Republic of Poland. Below a stylized image of the Tomb of the Unknown Soldier on Piłsudski Square in Warsaw. Below, an inscription: 200/ZŁOTYCH. At the top a circumscription: RZECZPOSPOLITA POLSKA and the notation of the year of issue: 2008. The Mint's mark under the Eagle's left leg: m/w. Reverse: A stylized image of a mounted commander-in-chief Józef Piłsudski. In the background on both sides stylized images of Polish infantrymen. At the bottom a circumscription: 90. ROCZNICA (90th anniversary). At the top a circumscription: ODZYSKANIA NIEPODLEGŁOŚCI (of regaining freedom).
90th Anniversary of Regaining Independence by Poland
Coin designer: Ewa Olszewska-Borys		Mint: Mennica Polska S.A.	
Value: zł 50	Alloy: Au 900/1000 (Gold)	Quantity: 8,800 pcs	Quality: Proof
Issued: 1 November 2008	Diameter: 18.00 mm (0.71 in)	Weight: 3.13 g (0.11 oz; 0.10 ozt)	Market value:
Obverse: At the top in the central part of the coin an image of the Eagle established as the State Emblem of the Republic of Poland. Below a stylized image of the Tomb of the Unknown Soldier on Piłsudski Square in Warsaw. Below, an inscription: 50/ZŁOTYCH. At the top a circumscription: RZECZPOSPOLITA POLSKA and the notation of the year of issue: 2008. The Mint's mark under the Eagle's left leg: m/w. Reverse: A stylized image of a mounted commander-in-chief Józef Piłsudski. In the background on both sides stylized images of Polish infantrymen. At the bottom a circumscription: 90. ROCZNICA (90th anniversary). At the top a circumscription: ODZYSKANIA NIEPODLEGŁOŚCI (of regaining freedom).
90th Anniversary of Regaining Independence by Poland (silver)
Coin designer: Ewa Olszewska-Borys		Mint: Mennica Polska S.A.	
Value: zł 20	Alloy: Ag 925/1000 (Silver)	Quantity: 110,000 pcs	Quality: Proof
Issued: 1 November 2008	Diameter: 38.61 mm (1.52 in)	Weight: 28.28 g (1.00 oz; 0.91 ozt)	Market value:
Obverse: At the top, on the right-hand side an image of the Eagle established as the State Emblem of the Republic of Poland. Below the Eagle the notation of the year of issue: 2008. On the left-hand side a stylized image of a war decoration, the Order Virtuti Militari [For Military Virtue]. At the top a circumscription: RZECZPOSPOLITA POLSKA. At the bottom a circumscription: 20 ZŁOTYCH. The Mint's mark under the Eagle's left leg: m/w. Reverse: On the left-hand side a stylized image of a bust of general Tadeusz Rozwadowski, below an inscription: Gen. TADEUSZ/ROZWADOWSKI. In the central part of the coin a stylized image of a bust of general Józef Dowbor-Muśnicki, an inscription: Gen. JÓZEF/DOWBOR-/MUŚNICKI below. On the right-hand side a stylized image of a bust of general Józef Haller, an inscription: Gen. JÓZEF/ HALLER below. At the top a circumscription: 90. ROCZNICA ODZYSKANIA NIEPODLEGŁOŚCI (90th anniversary of regaining freedom).
450 Years of the Polish Postal Service (gold)
Coin designer: Robert Kotowicz		Mint: Mennica Polska S.A.	
Value: zł 200	Alloy: Au 900/1000 (Gold)	Quantity: 11,000 pcs	Quality: Proof
Issued: 19 November 2008	Diameter: 27.00 mm (1.06 in)	Weight: 15.50 g (0.55 oz; 0.50 ozt)	Market value:
Obverse: On the right-hand side at the bottom, an image of the Eagle established as the state emblem of the Republic of Poland against a background of a fragment of postage stamp. In the central part, a stylized postage stamp with a fragment of the image of a watercolour picture depicting the change of horses at a postal stage. At the bottom on the left-hand side, an inscription: 200/ZŁ. On the left-hand side and at the top a circumscription: RZECZPOSPOLITA POLSKA. On the right-hand side vertically the notation of the year of issue: 2008. The Mint's mark, m/w, under the Eagle's left leg. Reverse: In the central part, a stylized image of a 19th-century mounted post rider on horse crossing a bridge. Below, a stylized image of the coat of arms of the Polish-Lithuanian Common-wealth in use during the reign of the king Sigismundus Augustus. On the left-hand side, a fragment of stylized image of the Wawel Cathedral and the Wawel Royal Castle in Cracow. On the right-hand side, a stylized image of St. Mark's Square in Venice and the outlines of fragments of two gondolas. At the bottom on the left-hand side, an inscription: 450/LAT (450th anniversary). Below the number "450", a stylized image of a postal trumpet. At the top, a circumscription: POCZTY POLSKIEJ (of the Polish Post).
450 Years of the Polish Postal Service (silver)
Coin designer: Robert Kotowicz		Mint: Mennica Polska S.A.	
Value: zł 10	Alloy: Ag 925/1000 (Silver)	Quantity: 135,000 pcs	Quality: Proof
Issued: 19 November 2008	Diameter: 32.00 mm (1.26 in)	Weight: 14.14 g (0.50 oz; 0.45 ozt)	Market value:
Obverse: At the top on the right-hand side, an image of the Eagle established as the state emblem of the Republic of Poland. In the central part, a stylized image of a postage stamp depicting stylized images of a mounted post rider on horse playing the trumpet and of trees, changing colours depending on the tilt angle. In the background of the postage stamp, a stylized image of a postal map and on the right-hand side a fragment of an image of a coach clock. On the left-hand side an inscription: 10/ZŁ. Below the inscription, vertically, the notation of the year of issue: 2008. At the bottom an inscription: RZECZPOSPOLITA /POLSKA. The Mint's mark, m/w, under the Eagle's left leg. Reverse: In the central part a stylized image of a 16th-century post courier. In the background a stylized fragment of a 17th-century engraved copperplate with an image of an inn. At the bottom on the left-hand side an inscription: 450/LAT (450th anniversary). Below, a stylized image of a postal trumpet. On the left-hand side and at the top a circumscription: POCZTY POLSKIEJ (of the Polish Post).
400th Anniversary of Polish Settlement in North America (gold)
Coin designer: Roussanka Nowakowsa		Mint: Mennica Polska S.A.	
Value: zł 100	Alloy: Au 900/1000 (Gold)	Quantity: 9,500 pcs	Quality: Proof
Issued: 17 December 2008	Diameter: 21.00 mm (0.83 in)	Weight: 8.00 g (0.28 oz; 0.26 ozt)	Market value:
Obverse: In the centre an image of the Eagle established as the State Emblem of the Republic of Poland against a stylized image of a wind rose. Above, the outline of fragments of the western coast of Europe and eastern coast of North America. Above, a semicircular inscription: RZECZPOSPOLITA POLSKA (the Republic of Poland). Below, an inscription: 100 ZŁ. On the left-hand side, the notation of the year of issue: 2008. The Mint's mark under the Eagle's left leg: M/ W. Reverse: In the centre a stylized image of a wind rose. Between its arms, stylized images: on the left-hand side at the top – a man smelting glass, below – an artisan making barrels, on the right-hand side at the top - a man making potware, below – a blacksmith at work. On the rim an inscription: 400. ROCZNICA POLSKIEGO OSADNICTWA W AMERYCE PÓŁNOCNEJ (400 years of Polish settlement in North America).
400th Anniversary of Polish Settlement in North America (silver)
Coin designer: Robert Kotowicz		Mint: Mennica Polska S.A.	
Value: zł 10	Alloy: ring: 925/1000 Ag oxidized, core: glass	Quantity: 126,000 pcs	Quality: Proof
Issued: 17 December 2008	Diameter: 32.00 mm (1.26 in)	Weight: 14.14 g (0.50 oz; 0.45 ozt)	Market value:
Obverse: In the centre, on the glass core, a stylized image of a man blowing glassware and on the rim of the core, an inscription: POLSKIEGO OSADNICTWA W AMERYCE PÓŁNOCNEJ (of the Polish settlement in North America), read from the reverse side of the coin. On the ring, fragments of a stylized map of Virginia. Above, an inscription: VIRGINIA, placed on a sash. To the left of the core, images of settlers, to the right, images of Indians. Below the core, an image of the Eagle established as the State Emblem of the Republic of Poland. To the left of the Eagle, the notation of the year of issue: 2008. To the right, an inscription: 10/ZŁ. At the bottom, a semicircular inscription: RZECZPOSPOLITA POLSKA (the Republic of Poland). At the Eagle's left leg, the Mint's mark: m/w. Reverse: In the centre, on the glass core, a stylized image of a man blowing glassware and on the rim of the core, an inscription: POLSKIEGO OSADNICTWA W AMERYCE PÓŁNOCNEJ (of the Polish settlement in North America). To the left and to the right of the core, stylized images of men smelting glass. Above the core, stylized images of ships and newly arrived settlers. Below the core, an inscription: JAMESTOWN, placed on a sash. Below, an inscription: 400. ROCZNICA (400 years).
90th Anniversary of the Greater Poland Uprising (gold)
Coin designer: Urszula Walerzak		Mint: Mennica Polska S.A.	
Value: zł 200	Alloy: Au 900/1000 (Gold)	Quantity: 9,400 pcs	Quality: Proof
Issued: 22 December 2008	Diameter: 27.00 mm (1.06 in)	Weight: 15.50 g (0.55 oz; 0.50 ozt)	Market value:
obverse: At the bottom, on the left-hand side, an image of the Eagle established as the state emblem of the Republic of Poland. On the right-hand side a stylized image of the Eagle holding in its beak and talons links of a chain torn apart. In the background an excerpt of the appeal issued by the Command of Ostrów Military District. At the top an inscription: 200 ZŁ. On the left-hand side and at the bottom a circumscription: RZECZPOSPOLITA POLSKA (the Republic of Poland) and the notation of the year of issue: 2008. The mint's mark: m/w under the Eagle's left leg. Reverse: A stylized image of charging cavalrymen and German soldiers fring at them from a kneeling position. At the bottom an inscription: 90 and a circumscription: ROCZNICA POWSTANIA WIELKOPOLSKIEGO (anniversary of the Greater Poland Uprising) in the rim.
90th Anniversary of the Greater Poland Uprising (silver)
Coin designer: Urszula Walerzak		Mint: Mennica Polska S.A.	
Value: zł 10	Alloy: Ag 925/1000 (Silver) with screen print	Quantity: 107,000 pcs	Quality: Proof
Issued: 22 December 2008	Diameter: 32.00 mm (1.26 in)	Weight: 14.14 g (0.50 oz; 0.45 ozt)	Market value:
Obverse: At the top, an image of the Eagle established as the state emblem of the Republic of Poland, on both sides of the Eagle the notation of the year of issue: 20–08. Below the Eagle a stylized image of a column of Greater Poland rifles at a march past, the unit commander riding a horse. A circumscription: RZECZPOSPOLITA POLSKA (the Republic of Poland) in the rim. The notation: 10 ZŁ at the bottom. The mint's mark: m/w under the Eagle's left leg. Reverse: On the left-hand side a stylized image of a white and red rosette - as worn by insurgents of the Greater Poland Uprising - with the Eagle in different shades of grey. On the right-hand side a stylized image of a bust of Ignacy Jan Paderewski. In the background an excerpt of the appeal issued by the Command of Ostrów Military District. At the top an inscription: 90. ROCZNICA (90th anniversary). At the bottom an inscription: POWSTANIA/WIELKOPOLSKIEGO (of the Greater Poland uprising).

== See also ==
- Numismatics
- Regular issue coinage
- Coin grading
