= Mint of Poland =

National mint (coin manufacturer) of Poland

Mennica Polska
- Type: Public (WSE:MNC)
- Industry: Metalworking
- Predecessor: Mennica Państwowa
- Founded: 10 February 1766; 260 years ago
- Headquarters: Warsaw, Poland
- Area served: Worldwide
- Key people: managing director - Katarzyna Budnicka-Filipiuk
- Products: coins, medals, electronic payments, gold, silver, diamonds
- Website: www.mennica.com.pl

The Mint of Poland (Polish: Mennica Polska) is a private company (Mennica Polska S.A.) which is the only private body permitted to manufacture (mint) coins and investment products in Poland. It is located in Warsaw. It is a joint-stock company, with a listing on the Warsaw Stock Exchange since April 7, 1998, which makes it the only mint in the world that is publicly traded.

== History ==
On 10 February 1766, the mint reform was effected in Poland, the new mint organized in Warsaw at Bielanska Street coined the gold, silver and copper pieces, as well as the medals and orders.
