= Dąbrowski Manor, Michałowice =

Coordinates: 50.150667°N 19.991389°E

Dąbrowski Manor in Michałowice
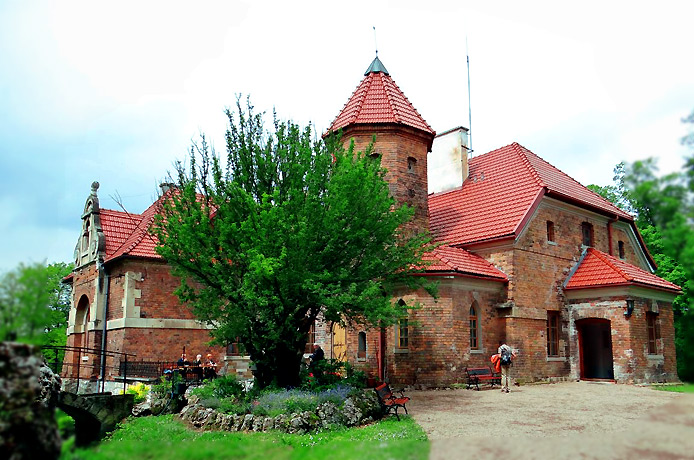
- Coat of arms: Radwan Coat of arms: Nałęcz
- Interactive map of the Dąbrowski Manor in Michałowice area

General information
- Architectural style: National Romantic and Historicism
- Location: Michałowice village, Michałowice rural administrative district, Kraków county, Lesser Poland province, Poland
- Construction started: 1892
- Completed: 1897
- Renovated: 1985
- Client: Żądło-Dąbrowski z Dąbrówki herbu (coat of arms) Radwan family
- Owner: Lorenz family

Design and construction
- Architect: Teodor Talowski

The mansion/manor home (dwór) in Michałowice village, Lesser Poland province, Poland, designed by prominent architect Teodor Talowski (1857–1910), and reminiscent of a suburban villa, was constructed in the years 1892–1897, for the noble (szlachta) family, Żądło-Dąbrowski z Dąbrówki herbu (coat of arms) Radwan, who moved from Mazovia, Poland.

The manor complex includes: the manor house, a granary, a stable, and a surrounding park.

The manor complex was entered into the Register of Immovable Monuments of Lesser Poland Province (also known as Małopolska voivodeship or Małopolska province) at the Provincial Office for the Protection of Monuments in Kraków.

== History ==
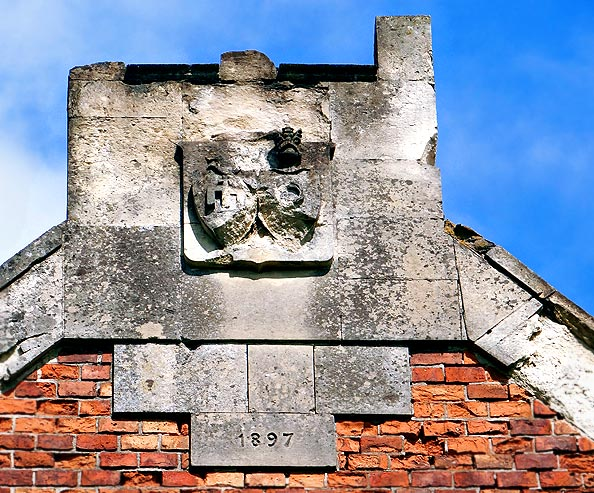
Stone cresting with herby (coats of arms) Radwan and Nałęcz from Żądło-Dąbrowski z Dąbrówki herbu (coat of arms) Radwan family manor in Michałowice village, Michałowice rural administrative district, Kraków county, Lesser Poland province, Poland. The initial manor proprietors were army major Tadeusz Jerzy Beniamin Żądło-Dąbrowski z Dąbrówki herbu Radwan (1829–1903), and his wife Maria, née Rostworowska herbu Nałęcz (1842–1927).

From the 13th to the 18th century, Michałowice village belonged to the monks of Miechów. By royal grant, King Stanisław II Augustus (1732–1798), in 1788, for an annual fee to the Academy of Kraków (Jagiellonian University), gave perpetual possession of Michałowice to Hugo Kołłątaj (1750–1812), a priest, prominent figure of the Polish Enlightenment, coauthor of the Constitution of 3 May 1791, rector and reformer of Jagiellonian University, and finally Deputy Chancellor of Poland. After Hugo Kołłątaj's death, the estate was taken over by his brother, former cavalry captain Jan Kołłątaj, and then passed to his daughter, Maria (Marianna) Krasicka.

Army major Tadeusz Jerzy Beniamin Żądło-Dąbrowski z Dąbrówki h. Radwan (1829–1903) obtained Michałowice village in 1875 from the Kołłątaj family. Tadeusz was married to Maria, née Rostworowska herbu (coat of arms) Nałęcz (1842–1927).

Before 1897, near where the brick and stone manor is located today, previously stood a wooden manor, where the Żądło-Dąbrowski family lived. In 1897, after construction of the brick and stone manor, the old manor was pulled down.

The next owner of the estate was the son of Tadeusz Jerzy Beniamin and Maria - Tadeusz Żądło-Dąbrowski (1873–1961). In the late 1920s, Tadeusz owned 732 acres of land, about 1.14286 square miles.

The Dąbrowski manor witnessed historical events, including the 1914 march of Marshal Józef Piłsudski's First Cadre Company under the command of Tadeusz Kasprzycki. Piłsudski's Cadre Company was the first regular division of the Polish Army since the end of the Polish 1863 January Uprising (one of the participants and leaders of the "Red" faction among the insurrectionists was Jarosław Radwan Żądło-Dąbrowski). In 1914, the border between the Austro-Hungarian Empire and Tsarist Poland ran through Michałowice village. The border was marked by two-meter-high posts bearing emblems of the Russian Empire. On 6 August 1914, Austria-Hungary declared war on Russia. At 2:45 a.m. that day, the First Cadre set out to cross the border between Austria-Hungary and Russia. At 9:45 a.m., as the First Cadre knocked down the border posts, and marched past into Tsarist Poland on a mission to liberate several towns from Russian control and ignite an anti-Russian uprising, the Cadre were silent as the Tsarist posts for them symbolically represented the dismemberment known as the Partitions of Poland. The First Cadre was saluted by a group of customs guards and Austrian dragoons staring speechlessly. First Cadre Commissary Aleksander Litwinowicz arrived at the Dąbrowski manor, where the Cadre was fed by, and had lunch with Tadeusz Dąbrowski, before moving on to do battle with the Russian Empire.

The wife of Tadeusz was Jadwiga, née Majewska (1881–1964). Their son, Jerzy Zygmunt Radwan Żądło-Dąbrowski (1908–1940), took part in the 1939 Defensive War of Poland (September Campaign). He was murdered in 1940 by the Soviet secret police (NKVD) in the Katyn massacre.

In the 1940s, under the Communist-dominated Polish government, the manor was seized from the proprietors and nationalized. The manor home housed the Peasant Self-help and Cooperative Bank of Słomniki. After the manor home burned down in 1979, it was left in ruins. In 1985, the manor was purchased by the Lorenz family, lovers of monuments and nature, and in particular, Teodor Talowski's architecture. They rebuilt the ruins at their own expense. The manor is currently owned by the Lorenz family.

Beginning on 6 August of various years, commemorative marches on the route of the First Cadre Company have taken place, including a stop at the Dąbrowski Manor in Michałowice, with food and drink served, in remembrance of Tadeusz Dąbrowski feeding the Polish Army in 1914, and the beginnings of Poland's re-emergence from non-existence after the Partitions of Poland.

== Architecture ==
The mansion/manor home (dwór) was designed by prominent architect Teodor Talowski (1857–1910) in a picturesque National Romantic and Historicism style for the Żądło-Dąbrowski family and built in the years 1892–1897.

== Gallery ==
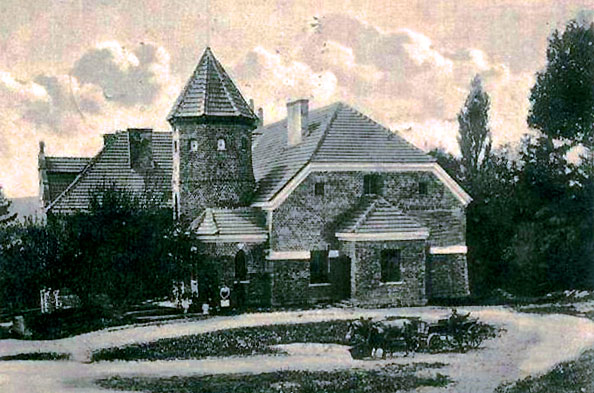
Dwór (Mansion) (taken from postcard) of the Żądło-Dąbrowski z Dąbrówki h. Radwan family in Michałowice village, Michałowice rural administrative district, Kraków county, Lesser Poland province, Poland; 1905

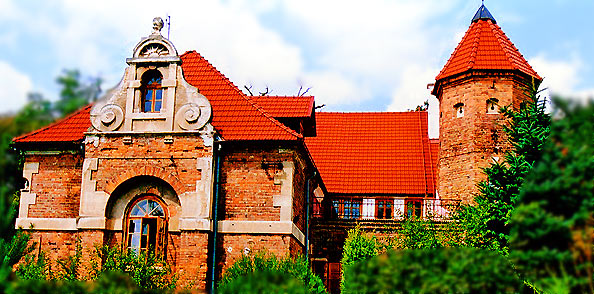
Dwór (Mansion) of the Żądło-Dąbrowski z Dąbrówki h. Radwan family in Michałowice village, Michałowice rural administrative district, Kraków county, Lesser Poland province, Poland

== See also ==
- Polish landed gentry

== Bibliography ==
- Biernacka-Lorenz, Monika. "Zabytki / Zespół dworsko-parkowy w Michałowicach" [Monuments / Manor and Park Complex in Michałowice] (website). michalowice.malopolska.pl (Online article) (in Polish). Michałowice rural administrative district, Kraków county, Lesser Poland province, POLAND, EU: Gmina Michałowice, Lesser Poland Voivodeship.
- Boniecki (Fredro-Boniecki), herbu Bończa, Adam Józef Feliks [in Polish] (1901). "DĄBROWSCY h. RADWAN z Dąbrówki pod Piasecznem, w ziemi warszawskiej, w różnych stronach osiedli, przeważnie w rożańskiej" [DĄBROWSCY of the RADWAN coat of arms from Dąbrówka near Piaseczno, in the Warsaw area, in various parts of the settlements, mainly in the Narew district.] (Online book). Herbarz Polski - Część I.; Wiadomości Historyczno-Genealogiczne O Rodach Szlacheckich. (Polish Armorial - Part I .; Historical and Genealogical Information About Noble Lineages.) (Noble/szlachta genealogical and heraldic reference) (in Polish). IV.. Warsaw, Warsaw governorate, Vistula land (Russian POLAND), RUSSIAN EMPIRE: Gebethner i Wolff: 147.
- "DWÓR DĄBROWSKICH W MICHAŁOWICACH - "Nowe życie dworu" (wystawa)" [DĄBROWSKI MANOR/MANSION IN MICHAŁOWICE - New Life of the Manor/Mansion (Exhibition)]. SlideShare (in Polish). Kraków, Kraków county, Lesser Poland voivodeship, Southern Poland, POLAND: Małopolska Institute of Culture. 12 December 2016. Archived from the original on 3 June 2017.
- Kobylarczyk, Katarzyna (2014). "MOMENTY: DWÓR DĄBROWSKICH W MICHAŁOWICACH" [Moments: Dąbrowski Manor in Michałowice]. Wielki Wybuch 1914-1918 [The Big Bang 1914-1918] (Online book) (History) (in Polish). Kraków, POLAND, EU: Małopolska Institute of Culture. pp. 111–112. ISBN 978-83-61406-57-0.
- Krajewski, Wojciech (27 July 2009). "95th Anniversary of First Cadre Company March Out". enumi.pl (Online article). Lębork, POLAND, EU: eNumi. Archived from the original (website) on 15 August 2018.
- Kwaśniewska, Elżbieta (2010). Kwaśniewska, Elżbieta (ed.). "Matka Małgorzata Dąbrowska z michałowickiego dworu" [Mother Małgorzata Dąbrowska From the Michałów Manor] (PDF). Kwartalnik Społeczno-Kulturalny (Social and Cultural Quarterly) (Journal, magazine: Periodical) (in Polish). 1–2 (25–26). Michałowice, Kraków county, Lesser Poland Voivodeship, POLAND, EU: Stowarzyszenie Przyjaciół Ziemi Michałowickiej „Nad Dłubnią”: 10. ISSN 1733-5507. Archived from the original (PDF) on 13 August 2018.
- Libicki, Piotr (2012). "DWORY I PAŁACE WIEJSKIE W MAŁOPOLSCE I NA PODKARPACIU" [RURAL HOUSES AND PALACES IN LESSER POLAND AND SUBCARPATHIA]. dworyipalace.com.pl (Online excerpt from printed book) (in Polish). Poznań, POLAND, EU: Dom Wydawniczy Rebis. Archived from the original (website) on 29 August 2017.
- "Manor in Michalowice" (website). filmcommissionpoland.pl (Online location database). Warsaw, POLAND, EU: Film Commission Poland.
- Maracha, Marta (2008). Kwaśniewska, Elżbieta (ed.). "Michałowice" (PDF). Kwartalnik Społeczno-Kulturalny (Social and Cultural Quarterly) (Journal, magazine: Periodical) (in Polish). 1–2 (17–18). Michałowice, Kraków county, Lesser Poland Voivodeship, POLAND, EU: Stowarzyszenie Przyjaciół Ziemi Michałowickiej „Nad Dłubnią”: 3. ISSN 1733-5507. Archived from the original (PDF) on 14 August 2018.
- "Marsz szlakiem I Kompanii Kadrowej" [March along the route of the 1st Cadre Company]. wmichalowicach.pl (Online article) (in Polish). Michałowice, Michałowice district, Kraków county, Lesser Poland province, POLAND, EU: Centrum Kultury i Promocji w Michałowicach (Center for Culture and Promotion in Michałowice). 13 August 2018. Archived from the original (website) on 18 August 2018.
- Minakowska, Maria Jadwiga. "Jerzy Zygmunt Żądło-Dąbrowski z Dąbrówki h. Radwan" [Jerzy Zygmunt Żądło-Dąbrowski From Dąbrówka of the Radwan Coat of Arms] (website). sejm-wielki.pl (Noble/szlachta genealogical and heraldic reference) (in Polish). Kraków, POLAND, EU: Dr Minakowska Publikacje Elektroniczne.
- Minakowska, Maria Jadwiga. "Tadeusz Żądło-Dąbrowski z Dąbrówki h. Radwan" [Tadeusz Żądło-Dąbrowski From Dąbrówka of the Radwan Coat of Arms] (website). sejm-wielki.pl (Noble/szlachta genealogical and heraldic reference) (in Polish). Kraków, POLAND, EU: Dr Minakowska Publikacje Elektroniczne.
- Nowostawska-Gyalókay, Joanna (2014). "Dwór Dąbrowskich w Michałowicach" [Dąbrowski Manor in Michałowice] (website). dnidziedzictwa.pl (Online article) (in Polish). Kraków, POLAND, EU: Małopolska Institute of Culture.
- "Obchody 90. rocznicy przemarszu I Kompanii Kadrowej" [Celebrations of the 90th Anniversary of the March of the First Cadre Company] (website). michalowice.malopolska.pl (Online photo collection) (in Polish). Michałowice, Michałowice district, Kraków county, Lesser Poland province, POLAND, EU: Gmina Michałowice, Lesser Poland Voivodeship. 6 August 2004.
- "Pałac w Michałowicach (zabytki w okolicy Krakowa)" [Palace in Michałowice (monuments near Krakow)] (website). bezmapy.pl (Online article) (in Polish). Marki, Wołomin county, Masovian providence, POLAND, EU: BezMapy.pl. 26 April 2016.
- "President commemorates March of First Cadre Company". polandinenglish.info (Online article). Warsaw, POLAND, EU: Telewizja Polska S.A. 6 August 2018. Archived from the original (website) on 15 August 2018.
- "Sierpniowy Piknik Wolności w Więcławicach" [August Picnic of Freedom in Więcławice]. wmichalowicach.pl (Online article) (in Polish). Michałowice, Michałowice district, Kraków county, Lesser Poland province, POLAND, EU: Centrum Kultury i Promocji w Michałowicach (Center for Culture and Promotion in Michałowice). 18 August 2017. Archived from the original (website) on 18 August 2018.
- Sztainke, Anna (June 2018). "WYKAZ OBIEKTÓW WPISANYCH DO REJESTRU ZABYTKÓW NIERUCHOMYCH WOJEWÓDZTWA MAŁOPOLSKIEGO: REJESTR "A"" [LIST OF OBJECTS ENTERED IN THE REGISTER OF IMMOVABLE MONUMENTS OF LESSER POLAND PROVINCE: REGISTER "A"] (PDF). wuoz.malopolska.pl (Electronic document) (in Polish). Kraków, POLAND, EU: Wojewódzki Urząd Ochrony Zabytków w Krakowie. p. 23. Archived from the original (PDF) on 11 April 2019.
- "Taka jestem" [That's How I Am]. dziennikpolski24.pl (Daily newspaper) (in Polish). Kraków, POLAND, EU: Dziennik Polski. 21 August 2010. Archived from the original (website) on 13 August 2018.
- Zdrada, Jerzy (1973). JAROSŁAW DĄBROWSKI, 1836-1871 (Online book) (Biography) (in Polish). Kraków, POLAND, EU: Wydawnictwo Literackie. p. 9.
- "Zespół dworsko-parkowy w Michałowicach" [Manor and Park Complex in Michałowice] (website). michalowice.malopolska.pl (Online article) (in Polish). Michałowice rural administrative district, Kraków county, Lesser Poland province, POLAND, EU: Gmina Michałowice, Lesser Poland Voivodeship.
