= Prawda =

Prawda may refer to:

- Prawda (surname)
- Prawda, Lesser Poland Voivodeship, Poland
- Prawda, Łódź Voivodeship, Poland
- Prawda, Manitoba, Canada
