= Commemorative coins of Poland: 2009 =

Commemorative coins offered by Poland in the year 2009

In the year 2009 coins were issued in the series: "History of the Polish Cavalry", "Animals of the World", "Poland’s path to liberation", "History of Polish Popular Music", "Polish Painters" and various occasional coins.

== Table of contents ==
History of the Polish Cavalry: The Polish Hussars (Winged cavalryman) - 17th Century (gold)
Coin designer: Andrzej Nowakowski		Mint: Mennica Polska S.A.	
Value: zł 200	Alloy: Au 900/1000 (Gold)	Quantity: 10,500 pcs	Quality: Proof
Issued: 23 January 2009	Diameter: 27.00 mm (1.06 in)	Weight: 15.50 g (0.55 oz; 0.50 ozt)	Market value: 1.645 zł
Obverse: At the top, on the right-hand side, an image of the Eagle established as the State Emblem of the Republic of Poland. Below the Eagle, an inscription, 200 ZŁ. Above the Eagle, the notation of the year of issue, 2009. In the middle of the coin, the stylized images of parts of the hussar's gear: zischägge helmet, breastplate, a mace and a lance with a pennant. On the left-hand side and at the bottom, a semicircular inscription: RZECZPOSPOLITA POLSKA. The Mint's mark, m/w, under the Eagle's left leg. Reverse: A stylized image of the hussar of the 17th century, on horseback, in armour, with wings and leopard skin on the back, holding a lance with a pennant. On the left-hand side and at the bottom, a semicircular inscription: HUSARZ – XVII w.
History of the Polish Cavalry: The Polish Hussars (Winged cavalryman) - 17th Century (silver)
Coin designer: Andrzej Nowakowski		Mint: Mennica Polska S.A.	
Value: zł 10	Alloy: Ag 925/1000 (Silver)	Quantity: 100,000 pcs	Quality: Proof
Issued: 23 January 2009	Dimensions: length: 22.40 mm (0.88 in) width: 32.00 mm (1.26 in)	Weight: 14.14 g (0.50 oz; 0.45 ozt)	Market value: 64 zł
Obverse: At the top, on the right-hand side, an image of the Eagle established as the State Emblem of the Republic of Poland against the stylized hussar's wing; on the left side of the Eagle, an inscription, 10 ZŁ; below the Eagle, the notation of the year of issue, 2009. Underneath, on the left-hand side, stylized images of parts of the Hussar's gear: a pennant, zischägge helmet and a mace. At the bottom, an inscription, RZECZPOSPOLITA/POLSKA. The Mint's mark, M/W, under the Eagle's left leg. Reverse: A stylized image of the hussar of the 17th century, on horseback, in armour, with hussar's wings and leopard skin on the back, holding a lance with a pennant. On the right-hand side, a vertical inscription, HUSARZ – XVII w.
90th anniversary of Establishment of the Supreme Chamber of Control of the Republic of Poland (silver)
Coin designer: Urszula Walerzak		Mint: Mennica Polska S.A.	
Value: zł 10	Alloy: Ag 925/1000 (Silver) with hologram	Quantity: 100,000 pcs	Quality: Proof
Issued: 6 February 2009	Diameter: 32.00 mm (1.26 in)	Weight: 14.14 g (0.50 oz; 0.45 ozt)	Market value: 73 zł
Obverse: At the top, an image of the Eagle established as the State Emblem of the Republic of Poland. On the left side of the Eagle, an inscription, 10. On the right side of the Eagle, an inscription, ZŁ. Below the Eagle, an oval hologram with a stylized image of the NIK logo, that changes colour depending on the viewing angle. Surrounding the hologram are some decorative elements. In the rim, a semicircular inscription, RZECZPOSPOLITA POLSKA, and the notation of the year of issue, 2009. The Mint's mark, m/w, under the Eagle's left leg. Reverse: In the centre, a stylized image of the present head office of the Supreme Chamber of Control. Below the image, an inscription, 1919–2009. At the top, a semicircular inscription, 90. ROCZNICA/UTWORZENIA. (90th anniversary of Establishment). At the bottom, a semicircular inscription, NAJWYŻSZEJ/IZBY KONTROLI (Supreme Chamber of Control of the Republic of Poland).
180 years of Central Banking in Poland (gold)
Coin designer: Ewa Tyc-Karpińska		Mint: Mennica Polska S.A.	
Value: zł 200	Alloy: Au 900/1000 (Gold)	Quantity: 8,500 pcs	Quality: Proof
Issued: 30 March 2009	Diameter: 27.00 mm (1.06 in)	Weight: 15.50 g (0.55 oz; 0.50 ozt)	Market value: 2.110 zł
Obverse: In the centre, an image of the Eagle established as the State Emblem of the Republic of Poland. Above the Eagle, the notation of the year of issue, 2009. Below the Eagle, an image of the coat of arms of the Kingdom of Poland from the times of the November Uprising. On the left side of the coat of arms an inscription: 200, on the right side of the coat of arms an inscription: ZŁ. At the top, a semicircular inscription: RZECZPOSPOLITA POLSKA. The Mint's mark, m/w, under the Eagle's left leg. Reverse: On the right side, a stylized image of Ksawery Drucki-Lubecki. Below, an inscription: KSAWERY/DRUCKI-LUBECKI. In the background, the head office of the Bank of Poland in the Bankowy square in Warsaw. At the top, on the left side, an inscription: 1828/2008. In the rim, an inscription: 180 LAT BANKOWOŚCI CENTRALNEJ W POLSCE.
180 years of Central Banking in Poland (silver)
Coin designer: Ewa Tyc-Karpińska		Mint: Mennica Polska S.A.	
Value: zł 10	Alloy: Ag 925/1000 (Silver)	Quantity: 92,000 pcs	Quality: Proof
Issued: 30 March 2009	Diameter: 32.00 mm (1.26 in)	Weight: 14.14 g (0.50 oz; 0.45 ozt)	Market value: 63 zł
Obverse: At the top, an image of the Eagle established as the State Emblem of the Republic of Poland. At the bottom, on the left-hand side, a stylized image of the head office of the Bank of Poland in the Bielańska street in Warsaw. At the bottom, on the right side, the notation of the year of issue, 2009. Below, an inscription: 10 ZŁ. At the top, a semicircular inscription: RZECZPOSPOLITA POLSKA. The Mint's mark, M/W, under the Eagle's left leg. Reverse: A stylized image of Władysław Grabski. On the left-hand side, an inscription: 1828/2008. At the bottom, against the background of a stylized image of a 10 zloty note from the year 1919, diagonally, facsimile of Władysław Grabski's signature. In the rim, an inscription: 180 LAT BANKOWOŚCI CENTRALNEJ W POLSCE
Animals of the World: European Green Lizard (Lacerta viridis)
Obverse designer: Ewa Tyc-Karpińska, Reverse designer: Robert Kotowicz		Mint: Mennica Polska S.A.	
Value: zł 20	Alloy: Ag 925/1000 (Silver)	Quantity: 100,000 pcs	Quality: Proof
Issued: 21 April 2009	Diameter: 38.61 mm (1.52 in)	Weight: 28.28 g (1.00 oz; 0.91 ozt)	Market value:
Obverse: An image of the eagle established as the state emblem of the republic of Poland. Under the eagle, the notation of the year of issue, 2009. At the bottom, an inscription: ZŁ 20 ZŁ. The images of the national flag of the Republic of Poland on the sides of the Eagle's legs. At the top, a semicircular inscription: RZECZPOSPOLITA POLSKA. The Mint's mark, M/W, under the Eagle's left leg. Reverse: In the centre, images of two lizards. The lizard on the left - standing on the rocks. In the background above and below, stylized images of plants. At the top, a semicircular inscription: JASZCZURKA ZIELONA - Lacerta Viridis.
Poland's path to liberation: The election of 4 June 1989 (gold)
Coin designer: Urszula Walerzak		Mint: Mennica Polska S.A.	
Value: zł 200	Alloy: Au 900/1000 (Gold)	Quantity: 10,000 pcs	Quality: Proof
Issued: 3 June 2009	Diameter: 27.00 mm (1.06 in)	Weight: 15.50 g (0.55 oz; 0.50 ozt)	Market value:
Obverse: At the top and in the centre, an image of the Eagle, established as the State Emblem of the Republic of Poland. Below, on the left-hand side, a stylized image of port cranes, and on the right-hand side, a stylized image of a mineshaft. At the top, a semicircular inscription, RZECZPOSPOLITA POLSKA, and the notation of the year of issue, 2009. At the bottom, an inscription, 200 ZŁ. The Mint's mark, m/w, under the Eagle's left leg. Reverse: On the right-hand side, the silhouette of a person raising a hand and making the “V for victory” sign. In the background, a stylized image of the Sejm hall and people inside. At the top, an inscription, 12.09.1989. On the left-hand side and at the bottom, a semicircular inscription, PIERWSZY RZĄD WIELKIEJ PRZEMIANY. In the word "WIELKIEJ", a stylized image of the national flag.;
Poland's path to liberation: The election of 4 June 1989 (gold, 25 zł)
Coin designer: Urszula Walerzak		Mint: Mennica Polska S.A.	
Value: zł 25	Alloy: Au 900/1000 (Gold)	Quantity: 40,000 pcs	Quality: Proof
Issued: 3 June 2009	Diameter: 12.00 mm (0.47 in)	Weight: 1.00 g (0.04 oz; 0.03 ozt)	Market value:
Obverse: In the centre, an image of the Eagle, established as the State Emblem of the Republic of Poland. Below, a stylized inscription, 25 zł. In the rim, an inscription, RZECZPOSPOLITA POLSKA. At the bottom, in a semicircular fashion, the notation of the year of issue, 2009. The Mint's mark, m/w, under the Eagle's left leg. Reverse: In the centre, a stylized inscription, SOLIDARNOŚĆ, replicating the logo of the Independent and Self-governing Solidarity Trade Union. At the top, a semicircular inscription, WYBORY. At the bottom, a semicircular inscription, 4 CZERWCA 1989
Poland's path to liberation: The election of 4 June 1989 (silver)
Coin designer: Urszula Walerzak		Mint: Mennica Polska S.A.	
Value: zł 10	Alloy: Ag 925/1000 (Silver) - additionally, red paint and several shades of gray paint	Quantity: 100,000 pcs	Quality: Proof
Issued: 3 June 2009	Diameter: 32.00 mm (1.26 in)	Weight: 14.14 g (0.50 oz; 0.45 ozt)	Market value:
Obverse: At the bottom, an image of the Eagle, established as the State Emblem of the Republic of Poland, against the background of a stylized image of an eagle without a crown. Above the eagle, an inscription, 10 ZŁ. At the top, a semicircular inscription, RZECZPOSPOLITA POLSKA, and the notation of the year of issue, 2009. The Mint's mark, m/w, under the Eagle's left leg. Reverse: On the left-hand side, a stylized image of Pope John Paul II holding a crosier, with crowds of people in the background. Above the crowd, an inscription, SOLIDARNOŚĆ, replicating the logo of the Independent and Self-governing Solidarity Trade Union in red and grey colours. Above, an inscription, 1979/1989. At the top, a semicircular inscription, "NIECH ZSTĄPI DUCH TWÓJ! I ODNOWI OBLICZE ZIEMI". At the bottom, an inscription, "TEJ ZIEMI!".
History of Polish Popular Music: Czesław Niemen
Coin designer: Robert Kotowicz		Mint: Mennica Polska S.A.	
Value: zł 10	Alloy: Ag 925/1000 (Silver)	Quantity: 100,000 pcs	Quality: Proof
Issued: 19 June 2009	Diameter: 32.00 mm (1.26 in)	Weight: 14.14 g (0.50 oz; 0.45 ozt)	Market value:
Obverse: At the bottom and on the left-hand side, an image of the Eagle, established as the state Emblem of the republic of Poland. On the right side of the Eagle, an inscription, 10 ZŁ. At the top and on the right-hand side, the notation of the year of issue, 2009. In the centre, the images of two portraits of Czesław Niemen: on the right-hand side, a semi-profile portrait; on the left-hand side, a stylized fragment of front portrait. Below the image of the portrait and on its right-hand side, an inscription, RZECZPOSPOLITA; on the right-hand side, it runs in a perpendicular manner. On the right-hand side, a perpendicular inscription, POLSKA. On the left-hand side, a perpendicular inscription, NIEMEN. The Mint's mark, M/W, under the Eagle's left leg. Reverse: A stylized image of the cover of the album entitled "sen o Warszawie", featuring an image of the figure of Czesław Niemen. At the bottom, a visible inscription, niemen/sen o warszawie, on the album cover. On the left-hand side, a perpendicular inscription, HISTORIA, against the album cover. At the bottom, an inscription, POLSKIEJ MUZYKI. On the right-hand side, a perpendicular inscription, ROZRYWKOWEJ. Next to it, the words CZESLAW NIEMEN, inscribed perpendicularly in an opposite direction.
History of Polish Popular Music: Czesław Niemen (square)
Coin designer: Robert Kotowicz		Mint: Mennica Polska S.A.	
Value: zł 10	Alloy: Ag 925/1000 (Silver)	Quantity: 100,000 pcs	Quality: Proof
Issued: 19 June 2009	Dimensions: length: 28.20 mm (1.11 in) width: 28.20 mm (1.11 in)	Weight: 14.14 g (0.50 oz; 0.45 ozt)	Market value:
Obverse: At the bottom and on the right-hand side, an image of the Eagle, established as the state Emblem of the republic of Poland. At the top and on the right-hand side, the notation of the year of issue, 2009. In the centre, an image of the portrait of Czesław Niemen. On the left-hand side, a perpendicular inscription, NIEMEN/CZESŁAW. Next to it, the word RZECZPOSPOLITA, inscribed perpendicularly in an opposite direction. At the bottom and on the left-hand side, an inscription, POLSKA 10 ZŁ. The Mint's mark, M/W, under the Eagle's left leg. Reverse: A stylized image of the cover of the album entitled “Katharsis”, featuring the crying woman who buried face in her hands. At the top a visible inscription on the album cover, N.AE./ KATHARSIS. On the left-hand side, a perpendicular inscription, HISTORIA POLSKIEJ, against the album cover. At the bottom, an inscription, MUZYKI ROZRYWKOWEJ, against the album cover.
65th Anniversary of the Warsaw: Uprising Warsaw-born poets (K. K. Baczyński)
Coin designer: Roussanka Nowakowska		Mint: Mennica Polska S.A.	
Value: zł 10	Alloy: Inner core: Ag 925/1000, Outer ring Ag 925/1000 plated with Au 999/1000	Quantity: 100,000 pcs	Quality: Proof
Issued: 24 July 2009	Diameter: 32.00 mm (1.26 in)	Weight: 14.14 g (0.50 oz; 0.45 ozt)	Market value:
Obverse: At the top, an image of the Eagle established as the State Emblem of the Republic of Poland against the background of a stylised rift in a wall filled by flames. To the right of the Eagle, the notation of the year of issue: 2009. Below, an inscription: 10 ZŁ. In the centre, an inscription: RZECZPOSPOLITA/POLSKA (Republic of Poland). On the left and right, stylised silhouettes of burning buildings. In the rim, a circumscription: 65. ROCZNICA POWSTANIA WARSZAWSKIEGO (65th anniversary of the Warsaw Uprising). At the bottom, in a semicircular fashion, stylised images of sheets of paper, a book, a helmet and the Symbol of Fighting Poland, against the background of a stylised image of a brick wall fragment. The Mint's mark: M/W under the Eagle's left leg. Reverse: In the centre, against the background of a stylised image of flames, a stylised bust of Krzysztof Kamil Baczyński with a badge of “Agricola” pinned to his jacket. At the top, a semicircular inscription: KRZYSZTOF KAMIL BACZYŃSKI. On the right-hand side, an inscription: POECI/WARSZAWSCY (Warsaw Poets). At the bottom, on the right, against the background of a stylised image of sheets of paper, an excerpt from the poem "Pocałunek" (A Kiss) by Krzysztof Kamil Baczyński: "…TRZEBA/NAM TERAZ/UMIERAĆ/BY POLSKA/UMIAŁA/ZNÓW/ŻYĆ." (we have to die now, so that Poland could live).
65th Anniversary of the Warsaw Uprising: Warsaw-born poets (T. Gajcy)
Coin designer: Roussanka Nowakowska		Mint: Mennica Polska S.A.	
Value: zł 10	Alloy: Inner core: Ag 925/1000 plated with Au 999/1000, Outer ring Ag 925/1000	Quantity: 100,000 pcs	Quality: Proof
Issued: 24 July 2009	Diameter: 32.00 mm (1.26 in)	Weight: 14.14 g (0.50 oz; 0.45 ozt)	Market value:
Obverse: At the top, an image of the Eagle established as the State Emblem of the Republic of Poland. To the right of the Eagle, an inscription: 10 ZŁ. Under the inscription, the notation of the year of issue: 2009. To the left of the Eagle, a stylised image of burning buildings and an explosion in front of them. Under the Eagle, a stylised image of the national flag of the Republic of Poland above a collapsed brick wall. Against the background of the wall, an excerpt of the poem “Do potomnego” by Tadeusz Gajcy: "…IDĘ PRZEZ POWIETRZE, A ZA MNĄ MIASTO MOJE IDZIE” (I walk through the air, and my city walks with me). At the top, a semicircular inscription: 65. ROCZNICA POWSTANIA WARSZAWSKIEGO (65th anniversary of the Warsaw Uprising). At the bottom, a semicircular inscription: RZECZPOSPOLITA POLSKA (Republic of Poland). The Mint's mark, M/W, under the Eagle's left leg. Reverse: In the centre, a stylised image of a bust of Tadeusz Gajcy in profile. On the right, an outline of a fragment of a rifle. At the top, a semicircular inscription: TADEUSZ GAJCY. At the bottom, in the background of a stylised image of a sheet of paper, an inscription: POECI/WARSZAWSCY (Warsaw Poets). On the left, a fragment of a stylised image of the Symbol of Fighting Poland.
95th Anniversary of First Cadre Company March Out
Coin designer: Robert Kotowicz		Mint: Mennica Polska S.A.	
Value: zł 10	Alloy: Ag 925/1000 (Silver)	Quantity: 50,000 pcs	Quality: Proof
Issued: 5 August 2009	Diameter: 32.00 mm (1.26 in)	Weight: 14.14 g (0.50 oz; 0.45 ozt)	Market value:
Obverse: On the right-hand side, an image of the Eagle established as the State Emblem of the Republic of Poland. Below the Eagle, the notation of the year of issue, 2009. In the centre, a stylized image of the obelisk in Michałowice commemorating the arrival of the First Cadre Company into the Kingdom of Poland. On the left-hand side, the inscription, 10/ZŁ. In the rim, the inscription, RZECZPOSPOLITA POLSKA. The Mint's mark, M/W, under the Eagle's left leg. Reverse: In the centre, a stylized fragment of the Monument to Legions’ Deed in Kielce. Above, the lyrics of the refrain of the song March of the First Brigade: "My, Pierwsza Brygada,/Strzelecka gromada,/Na stos rzuciliśmy/- swój życia los,/Na stos na stos!". On its right-hand side, a fragment of the text of the first verse: Legiony to/Legiony to/Legiony to/Legiony to. Underneath, on the left-hand side, the inscription, 95. Under the inscription, a diagonal inscription, ROCZNICA/ANNIVERSARY. Underneath, a stylized fragment of the music score. In the rim, the inscription, WYMARSZU PIERWSZEJ KOMPANII KADROWEJ / OF THE MARCH OUT OF THE FIRST CADRE COMPANY.
65th Anniversary of the Liquidation of the Lodz Ghetto
Coin designer: Ewa Tyc-Karpińska		Mint: Mennica Polska S.A.	
Value: zł 20	Alloy: Ag 925/1000 (Silver, oxidized)	Quantity: 50,000 pcs	Quality: Proof
Issued: 19 August 2009	Diameter: 38.61 mm (1.52 in)	Weight: 28.28 g (1.00 oz; 0.91 ozt)	Market value:
Obverse: At the top and on the right-hand side, an image of the Eagle, established as the State Emblem of the Republic of Poland. Underneath, the inscription, 20 ZŁ, against the stylized image of a fragment of a brick wall. On the left-hand side, the stylized image of a twig of an oak tree. In the rim, the inscription, RZECZPOSPOLITA POLSKA, and the notation of the year of issue, 2009. The Mint's mark, M/W, under the Eagle's left leg. Reverse: An image of the Star of David placed in the centre of the crown of the stylized image of an oak tree. At the top, the semicircular inscription, 65. ROCZNICA LIKWIDACJI (65th ANNIVERSARY OF LIQUIDATION). At the bottom, the image of barbed wire fencing. Above the fencing, the inscription, GETTA w ŁODZI (OF LODZ GHETTO).
September 1939 - Warsaw
Coin designer: Dominika Karpińska-Kopiec		Mint: Mennica Polska S.A.	
Value: zł 200	Alloy: Au 900/1000 (Gold)	Quantity: 10,500 pcs	Quality: Proof
Issued: 28 August 2009	Diameter: 27.00 mm (1.06 in)	Weight: 15.50 g (0.55 oz; 0.50 ozt)	Market value:
Obverse: On the left-hand side, an image of the Eagle established as the State Emblem of the Republic of Poland. Against the background of the Eagle, a stylized image of fames. On the right-hand side, a stylized image of the monument of the Warsaw Mermaid. At the bottom, the inscription: 200 ZŁ. At the top, the semicircular inscription: RZECZPOSPOLITA POLSKA (the Republic of Poland) and the notation of the year of issue: 2009. The Mint's mark, M/W, under the Eagle's left leg. Reverse: On the left-hand side, a silhouette of the burning Clock Tower against the background of a stylized face of the clock of the Royal Castle in Warsaw. Above, a stylized image of a plane dropping bombs. In the centre, the vertical inscription: WARSZAWA/WRZESIEŃ 1939 (Warsaw/September 1939). On the right-hand side, a stylized image of the bust of Stefan Starzyński. Underneath, the semicircular inscription: STEFAN STARZYŃSKI.
September 1939 - Wieluń (silver)
Obverse designer: Urszula Walerzak; Reverse designer: Wojciech Siudmak		Mint: Mennica Polska S.A.	
Value: zł 10	Alloy: Ag 925/1000 (Silver)	Quantity: 100,000 pcs	Quality: Proof
Issued: 28 August 2009	Diameter: 32.00 mm (1.26 in)	Weight: 14.14 g (0.50 oz; 0.45 ozt)	Market value:
Obverse: At the top, an image of the Eagle established as the State Emblem of the Republic of Poland. Below the Eagle, a stylized image of the territory of the Republic of Poland with its borders as of 1 September 1939. In the middle of the territory, a stylized image of a crack. On the left-hand size, an arrow with the symbol of swastika, on the right-hand side, an arrow with the hammer and sickle both pointing at the territory of the Republic of Poland symbolizing German and Russian invasion. Below the arrows, the dates: 01.09.1939 and 17.09.1939. In the rim, the inscription: RZECZPOSPOLITA POLSKA (the Republic of Poland) and the notation of the year of issue: 2009. At the bottom, the inscription: 10 ZŁ. The Mint's mark, M/W, under the Eagle's left leg. Reverse: Stylized images of three Junkers planes against the background of clouds and falling bombs. Among the clouds, a stylized image of the Town Hall with the Kraków Gate in Wieluń. At the top, the semicircular inscription: WIELUŃ – 1 WRZEŚNIA 1939 (Wieluń — 1 September 1939).
100 years of the Tatra Mountains Voluntary Rescue Service (TOPR) in Poland (gold)
Coin designer: Dominika Karpińska-Kopiec		Mint: Mennica Polska S.A.	
Value: zł 100	Alloy: Au 900/1000 (Gold)	Quantity: 10,000 pcs	Quality: Proof with latent image
Issued: 24 September 2009	Diameter: 21.00 mm (0.83 in)	Weight: 8.00 g (0.28 oz; 0.26 ozt)	Market value:
Obverse: On the left-hand side, an image of the Eagle, established as the State Emblem of the Republic of Poland. Underneath, the inscription: 100 ZŁ. On the right side of the Eagle, a stylised image of the silhouette of Mariusz Zaruski. Against the background, a stylised outline of the peaks of Cubryna and Mięguszowiecki Szczyt Wielki. At the top, the semicircular inscription: MARIUSZ ZARUSKI. At the bottom, in the rim, the inscription: RZECZPOSPOLITA POLSKA [THE REPUBLIC OF POLAND] and the notation of the year of issue: 2009. The Mint's mark, M/W under the Eagle's left leg. Reverse: At the bottom, a stylized image of Mięguszowieckie Szczyty and Cubryna, against their background the inscription: 100. ROCZNICA POWSTANIA [THE 100th ANNIVERSARY OF THE ESTABLISHMENT]. Above Mięguszowieckie Szczyty and Cubryna an outline of the peaks of Mnich, Cubryna and Mięguszowiecki Szczyt Wielki. At the back, the outline of Niżne Rysy, Rysy and Żabi Koń. At the top, depending on the angle of viewing, stylized images of two helicopters. In the rim, the inscription: TATRZAŃSKIEGO OCHOTNICZEGO POGOTOWIA RATUNKOWEGO [OF THE TATRA MOUNTAIN VOLUNTARY RESCUE SERVICE].
100 years of the Tatra Mountains Voluntary Rescue Service (TOPR) in Poland (silver)
Coin designer: Dominika Karpińska-Kopiec		Mint: Mennica Polska S.A.	
Value: zł 10	Alloy: Ag 925/1000 (Silver)	Quantity: 100,000 pcs	Quality: Proof
Issued: 24 September 2009	Diameter: 32.00 mm (1.26 in)	Weight: 14.14 g (0.50 oz; 0.45 ozt)	Market value:
Obverse: At the bottom, on the right-hand side, an image of the Eagle established as the State Emblem of the Republic of Poland. At the bottom, on the left side of the Eagle, notation of the year of issue: 2009. In the centre TOPR emblem – a blue cross against a white background with the inscription: -TATRZAŃSKIE-OCHOTNICZE-POGOTOWIE-RATUNKOWE - 1909 [THE TATRA MOUNTAIN VOLUNTARY RESCUE SERVICE – 1909]. Below the cross, a twig of dwarf mountain pine. Underneath, the inscription: 10 ZŁ. Against the background, stylized fragments of ornamentation in the Polish highland style. At the bottom, the inscription: RZECZPOSPOLITA POLSKA [THE REPUBLIC OF POLAND]. The Mint's mark, M/W under the Eagle's left leg. Reverse: On the left-hand side, a stylized image of the bust of Mieczysław Karłowicz. Against the background, on the right-hand side, a stylized outline of the peak of Mały Kościelec and mounttainrange of Świnica. Underneath, the inscription: MIECZYSŁAW KARŁOWICZ. In the rim, the inscription: 100. ROCZNICA POWSTANIA TATRZAŃSKIEGO OCHOTNICZEGO POGOTOWIA RATUNKOWEGO [THE 100th ANNIVERSARY OF THE ESTABLISHMENT OF THE TATRA MOUNTAIN VOLUNTARY RESCUE SERVICE].
25th anniversary of Jerzy Popiełuszko's death (gold)
Coin designer: Grzegorz Pfeifer		Mint: Mennica Polska S.A.	
Value: zł 37	Alloy: Au 900/1000 (Gold)	Quantity: 60,000 pcs	Quality: Proof
Issued: 13 October 2009	Diameter: 14.00 mm (0.55 in)	Weight: 1.7 g (0.06 oz; 0.05 ozt)	Market value:
Obverse: At the top, an image of the Eagle, established as the State Emblem of the Republic of Poland. Below the Eagle, the inscription, ŻYŁ 37 LAT (lived 37 years) against a stylized image of waves on the water. Underneath, under the digit 7, the perpendicular inscription, ZŁ. At the top, a semicircular inscription, RZECZPOSPOLITA POLSKA (the Republic of Poland) and the notation of the year of issue: 2009. The Mint's mark, M/W, under the Eagle's left leg. Reverse: At the top, a stylized image of a cross and hands holding crosses. Underneath, the inscription, ZŁO DOBREM/ZWYCIĘŻAJ (Vanquish evil with good). At the bottom, a semicircular inscription, KS. JERZY POPIEŁUSZKO 1947–1984
25th anniversary of Jerzy Popiełuszko's death (silver)
Coin designer: Grzegorz Pfeifer		Mint: Mennica Polska S.A.	
Value: zł 10	Alloy: Ag 925/1000 (Silver, with cubic zirconia)	Quantity: 100,000 pcs	Quality: Proof
Issued: 13 October 2009	Diameter: 32.00 mm (1.26 in)	Weight: 14.14 g (0.50 oz; 0.45 ozt)	Market value:
Obverse: At the top and to the right-hand side, an image of the Eagle, established as the State Emblem of the Republic of Poland. On the left side of the Eagle, the inscription, ZŁO DOBREM/ZWYCIĘŻAJ (Vanquish evil with good). Underneath, a stylized image of a rose on a tombstone. Below, the inscription, Ś†P/KS. JERZY POPIEŁUSZKO/LAT 37/ZAMORDOWANY 19 X 1984 (R.I.P.† Rev. Jerzy Popiełuszko/ Age 37/ Murdered on 19 Oct. 1984). At the top and to the left, a semicircular inscription, RZECZPOSPOLITA POLSKA 10 ZŁ (the Republic of Poland, 10 ZŁ) and the notation of the year of issue, 2009. The Mint's mark, M/W, under the Eagle's left leg. Reverse: On the right-hand side, a stylized image of Father Jerzy Popiełuszko. On the left-hand side and in the background, a stylized image of the territory of Poland with the reaches of the Vistula River, and a stylized image of a drop of blood, made of red cubic zirconia. Underneath, the inscription, 25. ROCZNICA/MĘCZEŃSKIEJ ŚMIERCI/ KS. JERZEGO POPIEŁUSZKI/1947–1984 (25th Anniversary of the martyr's death of Rev. Jerzy Popiełuszko.
Poles Who Saved the Jews: Irena Sendler, Zofia Kossak-Szczucka, Sister Matylda Getter
Coin designer: Roussanka Nowakowska		Mint: Mennica Polska S.A.	
Value: zł 20	Alloy: Ag 925/1000 (Silver)	Quantity: 100,000 pcs	Quality: Proof
Issued: 2 December 2009	Diameter: 38.61 mm (1.52 in)	Weight: 28.28 g (1.00 oz; 0.91 ozt)	Market value:
obveRse: In the centre, an image of the Eagle established as the State Emblem of the Republic of Poland. Below the Eagle, a stylised image of a wall with a breach in the middle and broken barbed wire. To the left of the wall, an image of the Star of David. At the bottom, an inscription, 20 ZŁ. To its left, the notation of the year of issue, 2009. On the right-hand side and at the top, a semicircular inscription, RZECZPOSPOLITA POLSKA (Republic of Poland). The Mint's mark, M/W, under the Eagle's left leg. Reverse: At the top, a stylised image of a bust of Sister Matylda Getter. On its right, a circumscription, SIOSTRA MATYLDA/GETTER (Sister Matylda/Getter). At the bottom, a stylised image of a bust of Irena Sendler; below, a circumscription, IRENA SENDLEROWA. At the bottom and on the right-hand side, a stylised image of a bust of Zofa Kossak; below, a circumscription, ZOFIA KOSSAK. On the left-hand side, a semicircular inscription, POLACY RATUJĄCY ŻYDÓW (Poles who saved the Jews). In the background, stylised images of birds
Polish Painters of the Turn of 19th & 20th Centuries: Władysław Strzemiński (1893–1952)
Coin designer: Ewa Tyc-Karpińska		Mint: Mennica Polska S.A.	
Value: zł 20	Alloy: Ag 925/1000 (Silver) and red, yellow, green and blue paints	Quantity: 100,000 pcs	Quality: Proof finish in silver (pad printing).
Issued: 7 December 2009	Dimensions: length: 40.00 mm (1.57 in) width: 28.00 mm (1.10 in)	Weight: 28.28 g (1.00 oz; 0.91 ozt)	Market value:
Obverse: On the left-hand side, a stylized image of Władysław Strzemiński's 1934 ”Unistic Composition 13”. At the bottom and on the right-hand side, an image of the eagle established as the state emblem of the republic of Poland. Around the Eagle, an inscription, 20 ZŁ and after a separator dot, an inscription, RZECZPOSPOLITA POLSKA (Republic of Poland) and the notation of the year of issue, 2009. The Mint's mark, M/W, under the Eagle's left leg. Reverse: Against Władysław Strzemiński's 1929 ”The Composition of Space”, on the left-hand side a stylized image of the profile of Władysław Strzemiński and on the right-hand side, a stylized image of a palette and three brushes. On the palette there are red, yellow, green and blue paints. Underneath, an inscription 1893–1952. At the top, an inscription, WŁADYSŁAW STRZEMIŃSKI. At the bottom, an inscription, WŁADYSŁAW STRZEMIŃSKI, written with characters designed by the artist.
70th anniversary of creating the Polish Underground State
Coin designer: Urszula Walerzak		Mint: Mennica Polska S.A.	
Value: zł 10	Alloy: Ag 925/1000 (Silver)	Quantity: 100,000 pcs	Quality: Proof
Issued: 14 December 2009	Diameter: 32.00 mm (1.26 in)	Weight: 14.14 g (0.50 oz; 0.45 ozt)	Market value:
Obverse: On the left-hand side at the top, an image of the Eagle established as the emblem of the Republic of Poland. Below the Eagle, an inscription: ZŁ 10 ZŁ. By the Eagle, against the background of a stylised image of an insurgent armband, an image of the Fighting Poland emblem, with the inscriptions: DELEGA-/TURA RZĄDU/NA KRAJ·KWP·/KWC·WACH-/LARZ·AKCJAV1·V2·/BURZA·/AKCJA OSTRA/BRAMA·WALKA/CYWILNA/BIP·/ŻEGOTA·/KEDYW·/27 WO-/ŁYŃSKA/DYWIZJA PIECHOTY AK·/POWSTANIE WARSZAWSKIE`/44·SZP·ZWZ·AK (Government Delegation for Poland, Polish Victory Service, Directorate of Underground Resistance, Directorate of Civil Resistance, Folding Fan, Operation V1, V2, Operation Tempest, Operation Gate of Dawn, Civil Resistance, Bureau of Information and Propaganda, Polish Council for Aid to Jews (Żegota), Directorate of Sabotage and Diversion KEDYW, 27th Volhynia Infantry Division of the Home Army, Warsaw Uprising, 44 Polish Victory Service, Union of Armed Struggle, Home Army) and on the left arm of the anchor, in inscription: 19/39, on the right arm of the anchor, in inscription: 19/45. At the top, a semicircular inscription: RZECZPOSPOLITA POLSKA (Republic of Poland) 2009. The mint's mark: M/W, under the Eagle's left leg. Reverse: On the left-hand side a stylised bust of Major General Stefan Rowecki. Against its background, a stylised image of a fragment of the Fighting Poland emblem. Diagonally, a stylised image of an insurgent armband with the inscriptions: SZP ZWZ AK (Polish Victory Service, Union of Armed Struggle, Home Army) and 1939/1945. Below the inscriptions: GEN. DYW. (Major General) MICHAŁ/KARASZEWICZ-TOKARZEWSKI „TORWID”/GEN. DYW. (Major General) TADEUSZ KOMOROWSKI „BÓR”/GEN. BRYG. (Brigadier) LEOPOLD OKULICKI/„NIEDŹWIADEK” In the rim, an inscription, GEN. DYW. (Major General) STEFAN ROWECKI „GROT” POLSKIE PAŃSTWO PODZIEMNE (The Polish Underground State).

== See also ==
- Numismatics
- Regular issue coinage
- Coin grading
