= Wola Więcławska =

- Village
- Location within Poland
- Coordinates: 50°10′52″N 20°0′54″E
- Country: Poland
- Voivodeship: Lesser Poland
- County: Kraków
- Gmina: Michałowice

Wola Więcławska [ˈvɔla vjɛnt͡sˈwafska] is a village in the administrative district of Gmina Michałowice, within Kraków County, Lesser Poland Voivodeship, in southern Poland.

== See also ==
- The Lesser Polish Way
