= Marcos Kurtycz =

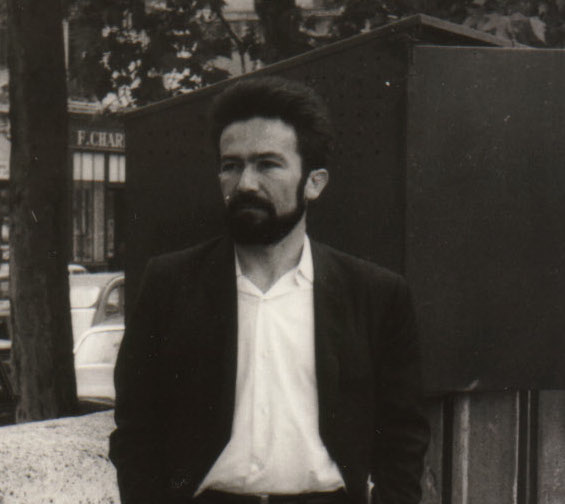
Kurtycz in Paris

Marcos Kurtycz (21 March 1934, Pielgrzymowice – 13 March 1996, Mexico City) was a performance and graphic artist.

== Background ==
Born in Poland in 1934 as Jan Kurtycz, he moved to Mexico in 1968 where he experimented with graphic design and performance art until 1996. Kurtycz artworks were often complex matrices combining performances and graphic design elements, including photographs, drawings, maps, wax forms, stamps, letters, musical notation and even axes and explosives. His performances and his photographic and print works on paper have influenced Mexico City artists. Kurtycz is known for his use of printing techniques in his graphic artworks. In the 1970s he mobilized his art projects into a challenge to the art establishment, including mail bombs (a series of artworks posted as letters), intended to push art establishment leaders beyond traditional conceptions of what constitutes art. Marcos Kurtycz is the father of graphic artist Anna Kurtycz.

== List of selected installations and performances ==
- Plastic algorithms (Warsaw, Poland, 1968)
- La Rueda (Mexico-City, 1976)
- La muerte de un impresor (Mexico-City, 1979)
- Un libro diario (Mexico, 1984). Homage to George Orwell.
- Zero Village (Pennsylvania, USA, 1988)
- CMAMOTH (Mexico-City, Guanajuato, New York City, 1989)
- Serpent rouge, vert et blanc (Toulouse, France, 1993)
- Egg Snake and Serpiente Escalera (Le Lieu, Canada, 1993)
- Proportions of Snake and Fax Snake (NIPAF, Japan, 1995)
- Serpiente del Metro (Mexico-City, 1995)

=== List of selected posthumous exhibits ===
- Museo de Arte Carrillo Gil (MACG), Mexico-City, 1999. “Marcos Kurtycz, Memoria”.
- P.S. 1 Contemporary Art Center, New York, 2002. Thumbnail retrospective in parallel with Mexico City: An Exhibition About the Exchange Rates of Bodies and Values".
- Museo Nacional Centro de Arte Reina Sofía, Madrid. Eco: arte contemporáneo mexicano. February 8 - June 6, 2005 (link: http://www.museoreinasofia.es/en/exhibitions/eco-arte-contemporaneo-mexicano)
- Fondation Cartier pour l’art contemporain, Paris: América Latina 1960-2013, coproduced with the Museo Amparo in Puebla (Mexico). November 19, 2013 to April 6, 2014
- Kurtycz Escamilla, Anna Rosa (2016). Marcos Kurtycz. Vida y muerte de un impresor. Studio Kurtycz.
- Witte de With Center for Contemporary Art, Rotterdam, The Netherlands, 2018 (Mauricio Marcín on Marcos Kurtycz)
- Museo Universitario de Arte Contemporanea (MUAC), Mexico-City, 2020.
- Graphic Dialogues, The Hague, The Netherlands, 2020. A retrospective of works by Marcos and Anna Kurtycz. Embassy of Mexico to The Netherlands
