= Książniczki =

- Village
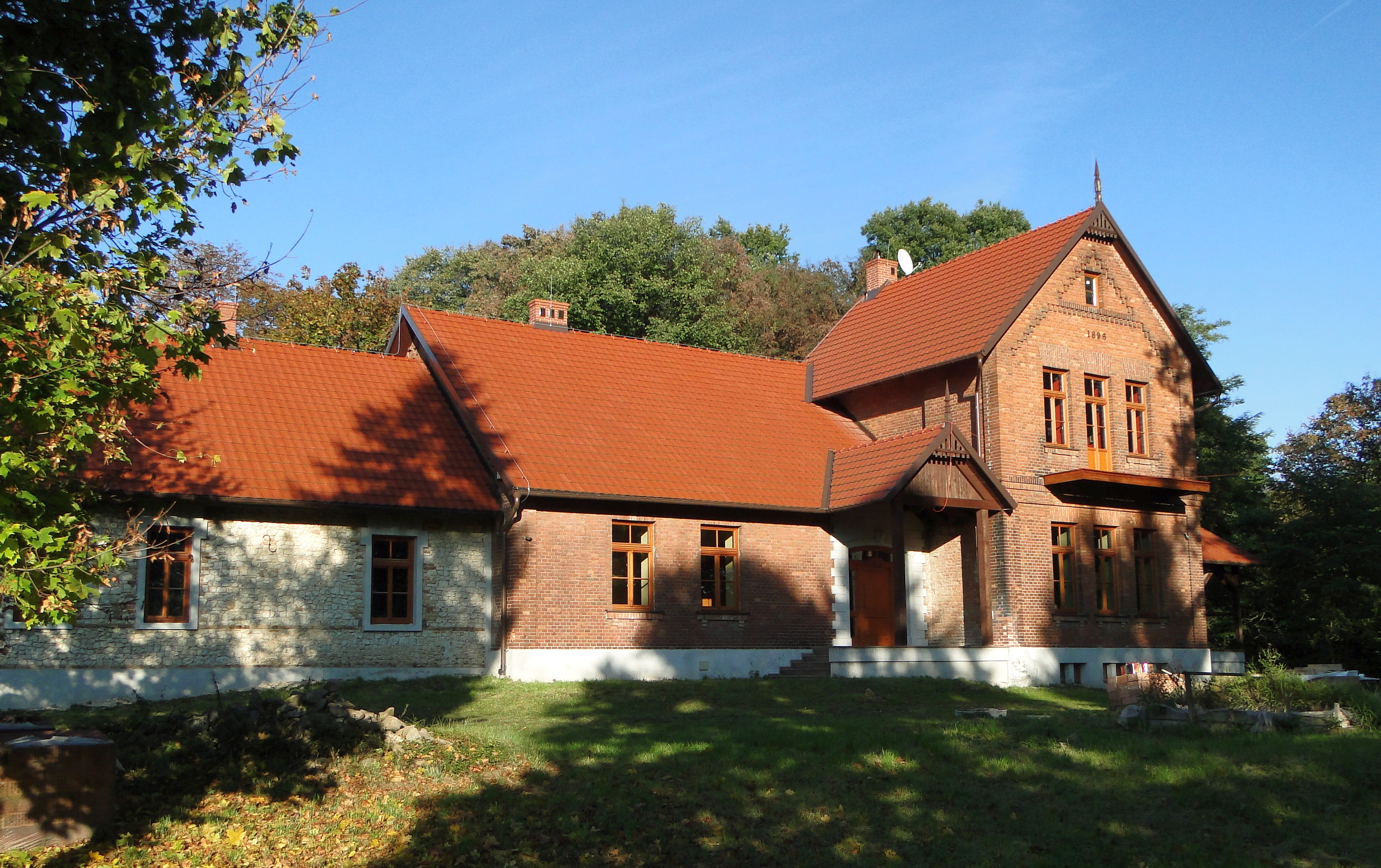
- Manor house

- Location within Poland
- Coordinates: 50°8′4″N 20°0′35″E
- Country: Poland
- Voivodeship: Lesser Poland
- County: Kraków
- Gmina: Michałowice
- Population: 280

Książniczki [kɕɔ̃ʐˈnit͡ʂki] is a village in the administrative district of Gmina Michałowice, within Kraków County, Lesser Poland Voivodeship, in southern Poland.

== See also ==
- The Lesser Polish Way
