= Zdziesławice =

Zdziesławice may refer to the following places in Poland:

- Zdziesławice, Lower Silesian Voivodeship (south-west Poland)
- Zdziesławice, Lesser Poland Voivodeship (south Poland)
