= Anna Kurtycz =

Mexican-Polish graphic artist (1970–2019)

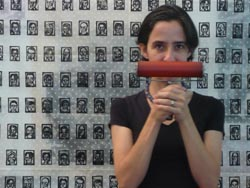
- Origenes, January 2019
- Born: 1970
- Died: 2019 (aged 48–49)

Anna Kurtycz (1970-2019) was a Mexican-Polish graphic artist specializing in wood engraving.

== Biography ==
Kurtycz was born in Mexico in 1970, as the eldest daughter of the Polish-Mexican avant-garde performance artist Marcos Kurtycz and Mexican economist and author Mercedes Escamilla, and lived in Guadalajara, Mexico for most of her youth. She received her undergraduate degree in Biology from the University of Guadalajara and she obtained a PhD in Communication from Paris University XIII.

From 1990 through 2003 Kurtycz pursued her career as an artist, often combining her artistic talents with her training in Biology and the environment to develop educational programs and materials to promote sustainable development in Latin America. She worked as a consultant in communication and education for Unesco on a number of projects, as well as a correspondent for the Mexican journal El Occidental (2000-2001), and as a freelance contributor to the Mexican newspapers El Jaliscience, PuntoG and Público, all while pursuing her career as a graphic artist. Her work has been exhibited in Benin, Ghana, Canada, France, Mexico, The Netherlands, the United States and in Spain. She has often collaborated with the Dutch artist RUDEK on various projects. Kurtycz died in 2019 in the Hague, Netherlands.

Kurtycz lived and worked in Africa, in Ghana and Benin, from 2008 to 2015. There she created exhibitions, art projects and printing workshops for adults and children. Her work using printing and graphic arts was sponsored by NGOs and local organizations.

In 2016, she presented the monograph Marcos Kurtycz. Vida y muerte de un impresor on the work of Marcos Kurtycz at the Museo Universitario del Chopo in Mexico.

Kurtycz's work is catalogued in the French Association for Contemporary Engraving ‘Graver maintenant’, the Contemporary Artists Catalogue of the Bibliothèque Nationale de France, and the Printers Association “Graver Maintenant” (France).

== Selected exhibitions ==
- The Beautiful Ones Are Not Yet Born (Ghana, 2012). In collaboration with the Goethe Institut.
- Petit et GRAND. (Sucy en Brie, France, 2012). Avec Association Graver Maintenant.
- Filles en uniforme (Benin, 2015). In collaboration with the French Cultural Institute.
- Chale Wote 2015 (Ghana, 2015).
- Broadening Horizons at Victor Laurentius Art Gallery (The Netherlands, 2016).
- African Perspectives (The Netherlands, 2017). In collaboration with the Africa Studies Center, University of Leiden.
- Movimiento (The Netherlands, 2019). In collaboration with the Mexican Embassy to The Netherlands.
- Graphic Dialogues (The Netherlands, 2020). A retrospective of works by Marcos and Anna Kurtycz. In collaboration with the Embassy of Mexico to The Netherlands

== Publications ==
- “The Ocean has told me” (published in three languages)
- "El Agua" (Instituto Mexicano de Tecnología del Agua, 1997)
- "Let’s Make our Own Business: Microscale Enterprises for Young People"
- "Hidroalfabeta" (OCLA, Guadalajara, 1992)
- "Del Uno al Doce" (OCLA, Guadalajara, 1992)
- "Cancionero del Agua" (OCLA, Guadalajara, 1991)
- "Agua pasa por mi Jalisco" (OCLA, Guadalajara, 1991)
- Guidance, Counselling and Youth Development Newsletter, Conception, graphic design and illustrations (UNESCO, 1999)
- "Hablemos del Agua" (OCLA, Guadalajara, 2000)
- "Le comportement environnemental responsable par rapport à l’eau comme une innovation" (Communication, Volume 20/2, 2001, Laval University, Quebec, Canada)
- “Water participation for Poverty Alleviation. The Case of Meseta Purépecha México” en Water Science and technology 47 (6) 145-148 (IWA 2003) in collaboration with Escamilla M. and van der Helm R
- "Understanding environmental behavioral change through communication: a new perspective of Environment and Sustainable Development" (Canada, 2005)
- "Imágenes de Ghana" (Luvina, Volume 55, Guadalajara, 2009)
