= Młodziejowice, Lesser Poland Voivodeship =

Młodziejowice
- Village
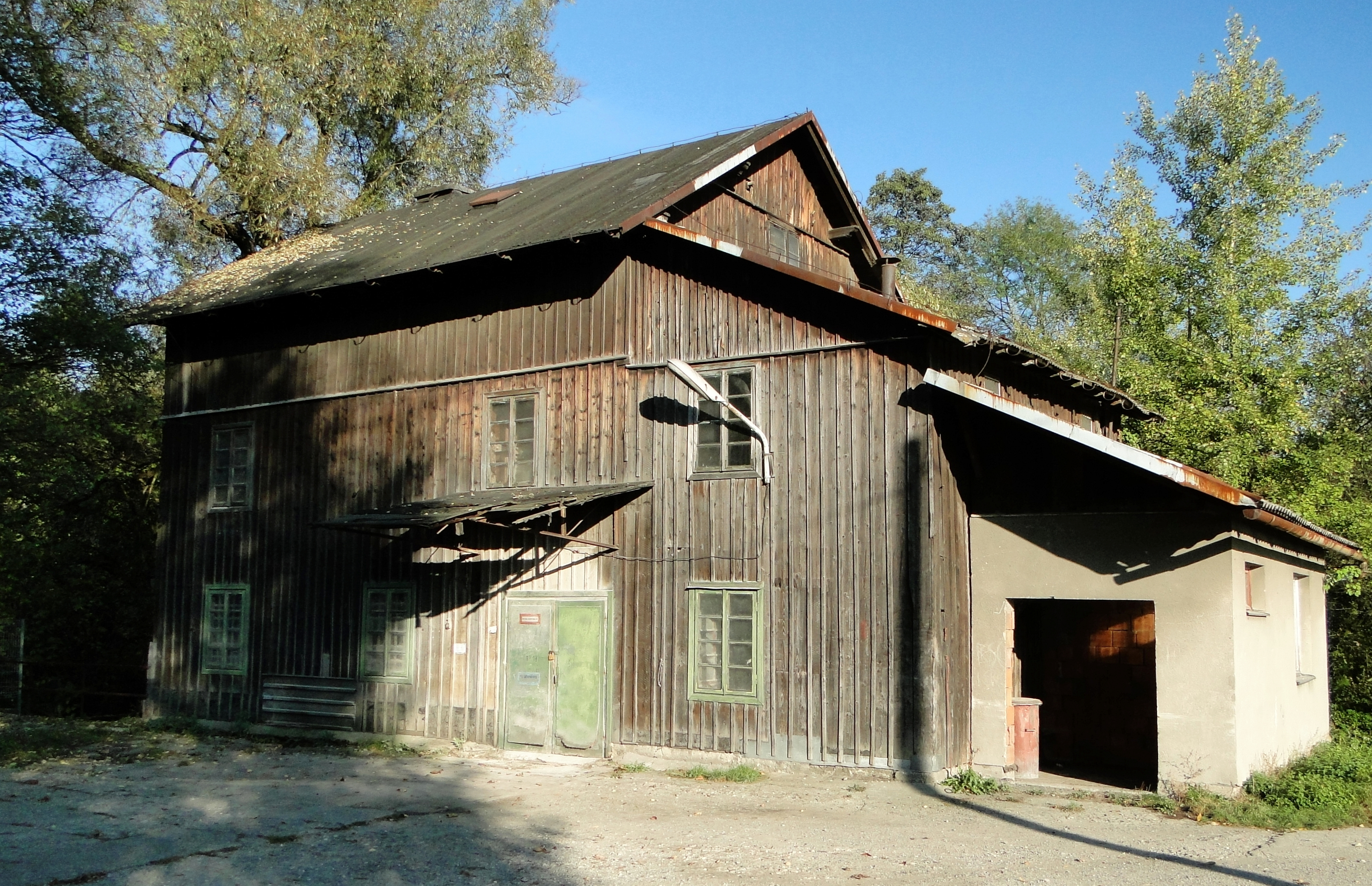

- Location within Poland
- Coordinates: 50°8′30″N 19°59′32″E
- Country: Poland
- Voivodeship: Lesser Poland
- County: Kraków
- Gmina: Michałowice

Młodziejowice [mwɔd͡ʑɛjɔˈvit͡sɛ] is a village in the administrative district of Gmina Michałowice, within Kraków County, Lesser Poland Voivodeship, in southern Poland.
