= Masłomiąca =

- Village
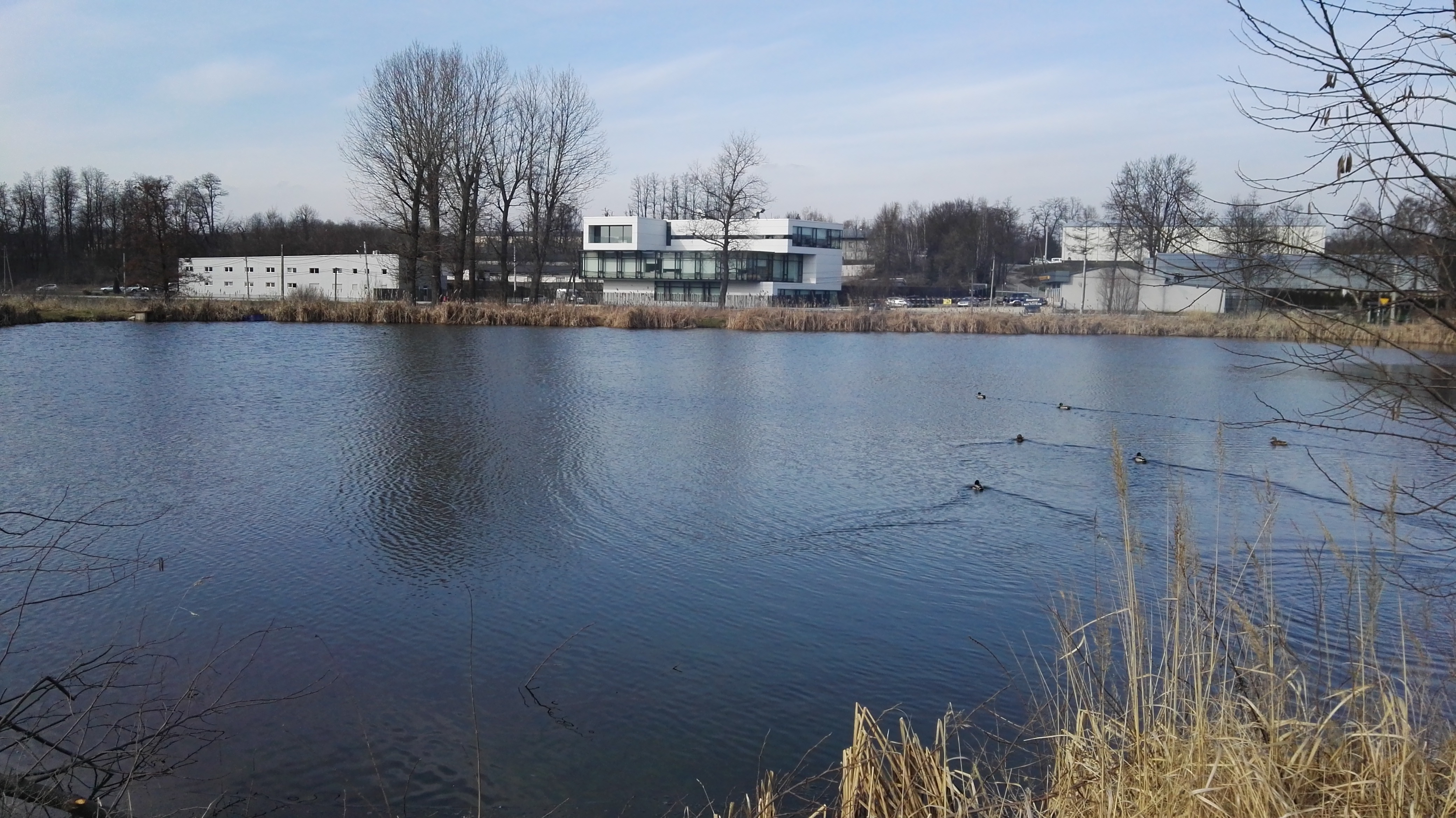

- Location within Poland
- Coordinates: 50°9′38″N 20°0′3″E
- Country: Poland
- Voivodeship: Lesser Poland
- County: Kraków
- Gmina: Michałowice

Masłomiąca [maswɔˈmjɔnt͡sa] is a village in the administrative district of Gmina Michałowice, within Kraków County, Lesser Poland Voivodeship, in southern Poland.
