= Polish landed gentry =

Historical social class

Polish landed gentry (Polish: ziemiaństwo, ziemianie, singular: zemianin, from ziemia, "land") was a social group or class of hereditary landowners who held manorial estates. Historically, ziemianie consisted of hereditary nobles (szlachta) and landed commoners (kmiecie; Latin: cmethones). The Statutes of Piotrków (1496) restricted the right to hold manorial lordships to hereditary nobility. The non-nobles thus had to either sell their estates to the lords or seek a formal ennoblement for themselves (not an easy task), or had their property taken away. A rare exception was the burgesses of certain specially privileged "ennobled" royal cities who were titled "nobilis" and were allowed to buy and inherit manorial estates and exercise their privileges (such as jurisdiction over their subjects) and monopolies (over distilleries, hunting grounds, etc.). Therefore, in the szlachta-dominated Polish–Lithuanian Commonwealth there was almost no landed gentry in the English meaning of the term, i.e. commoners who owned landed estates. (However, this is merely a matter of semantics; the gentry of England were roughly equivalent to lower nobility of other countries.) With the Partitions these restrictions were loosened and finally any commoner could buy or inherit land. This made the 20th-century Polish landed gentry consist mostly of hereditary nobles, but also of others.

They were the lesser members of the szlachta, contrasting with the much smaller but more powerful group of "magnate" families (sing. magnat, plural magnaci in Polish), see "Magnates of Poland and Lithuania". Compared to the situation in England and some other parts of Europe, these two parts of the overall "nobility" to a large extent operated as different classes, and were often in conflict. After the Partitions of Poland, at least in the stereotypes of 19th-century nationalist lore, the magnates often made themselves at home in the capitals and courts of the partitioning powers, while the gentry remained on their estates, keeping the national culture alive (for a preserved, non-magnate example, see Dąbrowski Manor in Michałowice).

== 20th century ==
Although the March Constitution of Poland (1921) abolished the legal class of hereditary nobility, szlachta or ziemiaństwo was informally recognized and remained an economic and social reality as well as a politically influential group, to a degree greater than hereditary nobility in European countries with more highly developed capitalism (and the remnants of feudalism mostly gone).

At the end of World War II, because of the Polish Land Reform Act passed in 1944 by the Polish Committee of National Liberation, landed gentry with larger estates was dispossessed and eliminated as a social group. Many land-owning families were eliminated or had their estates confiscated by the Germans or Soviets, earlier during the war.

With the liquidation of the Polish People's Republic (1989), the descendants of Polish landed gentry became politically active, struggling for (and often succeeding in) restoration of land ownership or at least compensation. Attempts to delegitimize the land reform of 1944 have also been made.
