= Wilczkowice, Kraków County =

Wilczkowice
- Village
- Location within Poland
- Coordinates: 50°11′0″N 19°58′34″E
- Country: Poland
- Voivodeship: Lesser Poland
- County: Kraków
- Gmina: Michałowice

Wilczkowice [vilt͡ʂkɔˈvit͡sɛ] is a village in the administrative district of Gmina Michałowice, within Kraków County, Lesser Poland Voivodeship, in southern Poland.
