= Sieborowice =

- Village
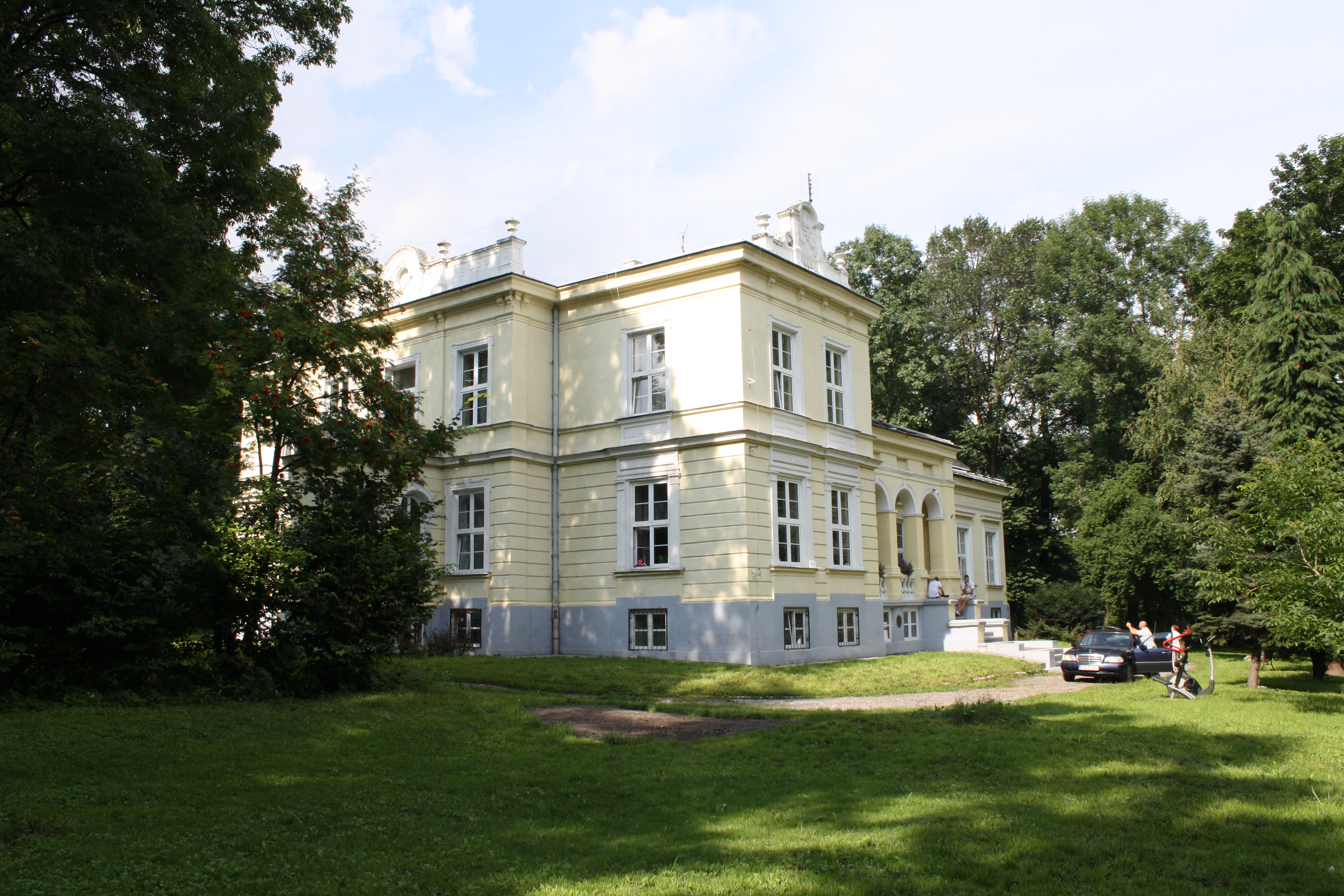
- Manor house

- Location within Poland
- Coordinates: 50°9′47″N 20°3′12″E
- Country: Poland
- Voivodeship: Lesser Poland
- County: Kraków
- Gmina: Michałowice
- Population: 260

Sieborowice [ɕɛbɔrɔˈvit͡sɛ] is a village in the administrative district of Gmina Michałowice, within Kraków County, Lesser Poland Voivodeship, in southern Poland.
