= Kozierów =

- Village
- Location within Poland
- Coordinates: 50°10′19″N 19°56′29″E
- Country: Poland
- Voivodeship: Lesser Poland
- County: Kraków
- Gmina: Michałowice

Kozierów [kɔˈʑɛruf] is a village in the administrative district of Gmina Michałowice, within Kraków County, Lesser Poland Voivodeship, in southern Poland.
