= Górna Wieś, Lesser Poland Voivodeship =

Górna Wieś
- Village
- Location within Poland
- Coordinates: 50°9′43″N 19°56′12″E
- Country: Poland
- Voivodeship: Lesser Poland
- County: Kraków
- Gmina: Michałowice

Górna Wieś [ˈɡurna ˈvjɛɕ] is a village in the administrative district of Gmina Michałowice, within Kraków County, Lesser Poland Voivodeship, in southern Poland.
