= Więcławice Dworskie =

- Village
- Location within Poland
- Coordinates: 50°9′32″N 20°2′8″E
- Country: Poland
- Voivodeship: Lesser Poland
- County: Kraków
- Gmina: Michałowice

Więcławice Dworskie [vjɛnt͡swaˈvit͡sɛ ˈdvɔrskʲɛ] is a village in the administrative district of Gmina Michałowice, within Kraków County, Lesser Poland Voivodeship, in southern Poland.

== See also ==
- Lesser Polish Way
