= Zerwana =

- Village
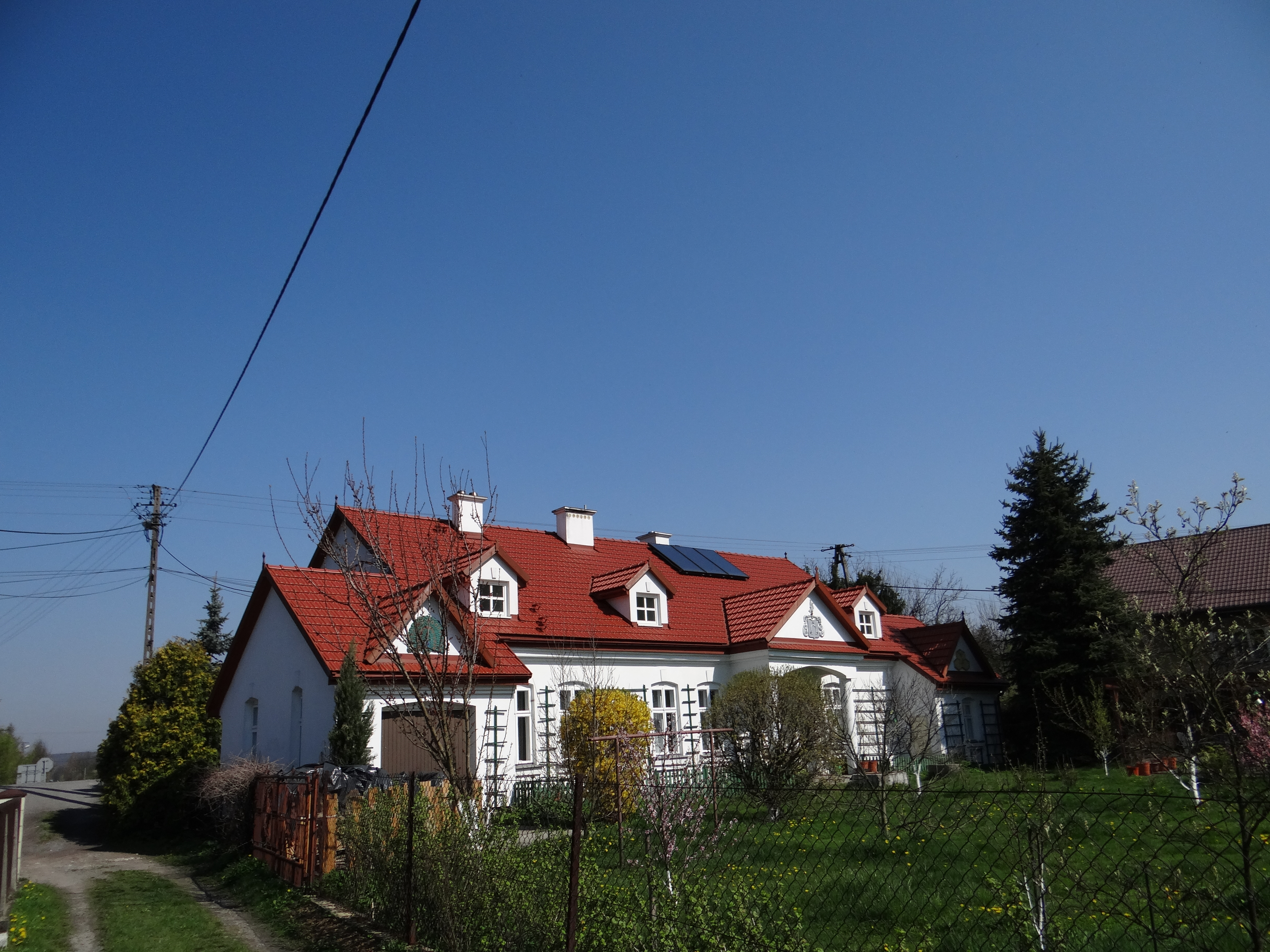

- Location within Poland
- Coordinates: 50°10′43″N 19°59′21″E
- Country: Poland
- Voivodeship: Lesser Poland
- County: Kraków
- Gmina: Michałowice

Zerwana [zɛrˈvana] is a village in the administrative district of Gmina Michałowice, within Kraków County, Lesser Poland Voivodeship, in southern Poland.
