= Zdziesławice, Lesser Poland Voivodeship =

Zdziesławice
- Village
- Location within Poland
- Coordinates: 50°8′43″N 20°1′23″E
- Country: Poland
- Voivodeship: Lesser Poland
- County: Kraków
- Gmina: Michałowice

Zdziesławice [zd͡ʑɛswaˈvit͡sɛ] is a village in the administrative district of Gmina Michałowice, within Kraków County, Lesser Poland Voivodeship, in southern Poland.

== See also ==
- The Lesser Polish Way
