= Firlejów =

- Village
- Location within Poland
- Coordinates: 50°11′36″N 20°0′16″E
- Country: Poland
- Voivodeship: Lesser Poland
- County: Kraków
- Gmina: Michałowice

Firlejów [firˈlɛjuf] is a village in the administrative district of Gmina Michałowice, within Kraków County, Lesser Poland Voivodeship, in southern Poland.
