= Zagórzyce Dworskie =

- Village
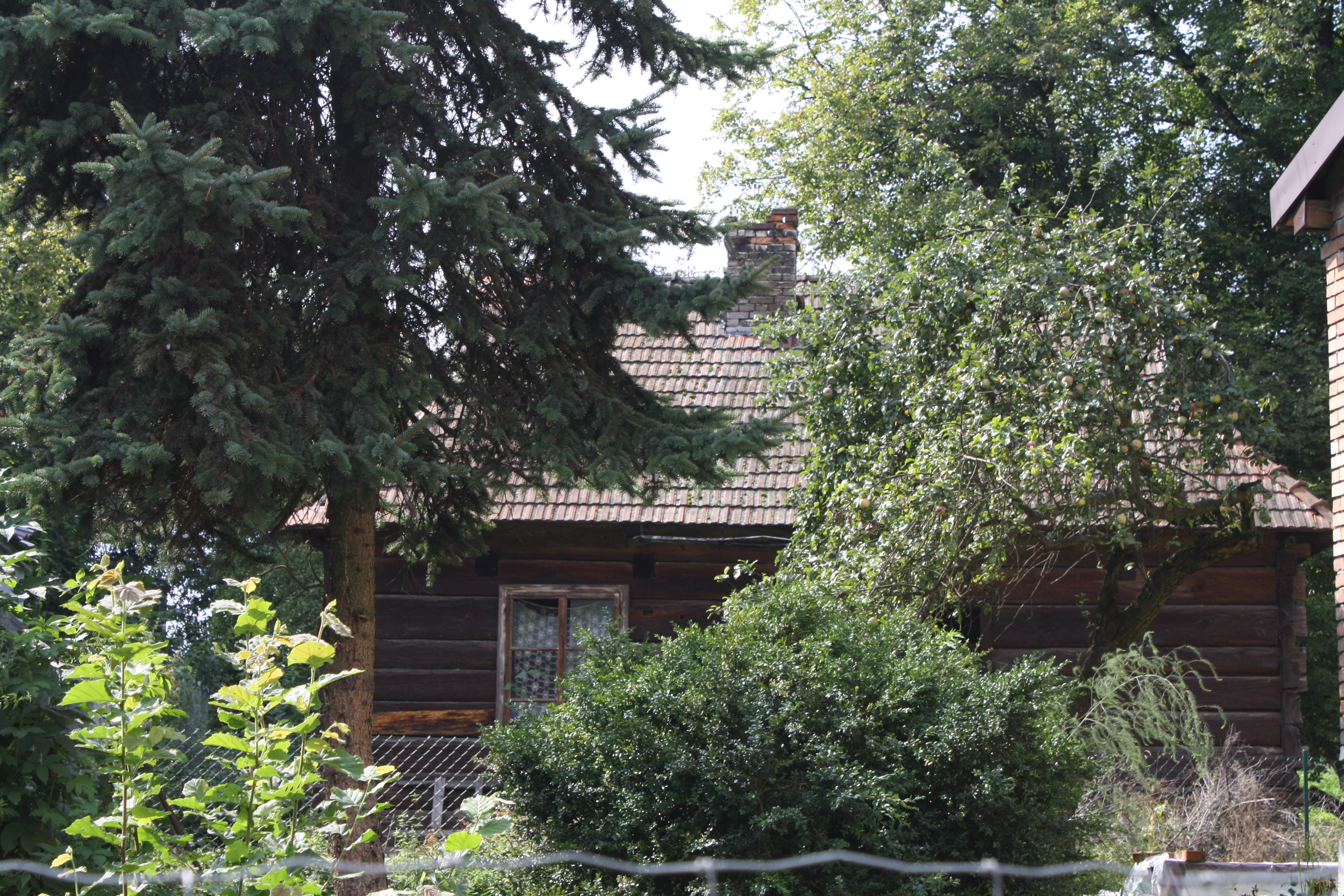

- Location within Poland
- Coordinates: 50°10′46″N 20°2′26″E
- Country: Poland
- Voivodeship: Lesser Poland
- County: Kraków
- Gmina: Michałowice

Zagórzyce Dworskie [zaɡuˈʐɨt͡sɛ ˈdvɔrskʲɛ] is a village in the administrative district of Gmina Michałowice, within Kraków County, Lesser Poland Voivodeship, in southern Poland.
