= Kończyce, Lesser Poland Voivodeship =

Kończyce
- Village
- Location within Poland
- Coordinates: 50°7′32″N 20°1′17″E
- Country: Poland
- Voivodeship: Lesser Poland
- County: Kraków
- Gmina: Michałowice
- Population: 218

Kończyce [kɔɲˈt͡ʂɨt͡sɛ] is a village in the administrative district of Gmina Michałowice, within Kraków County, Lesser Poland Voivodeship, in southern Poland.
