= Michałowice, Lesser Poland Voivodeship =

Michałowice
- Village
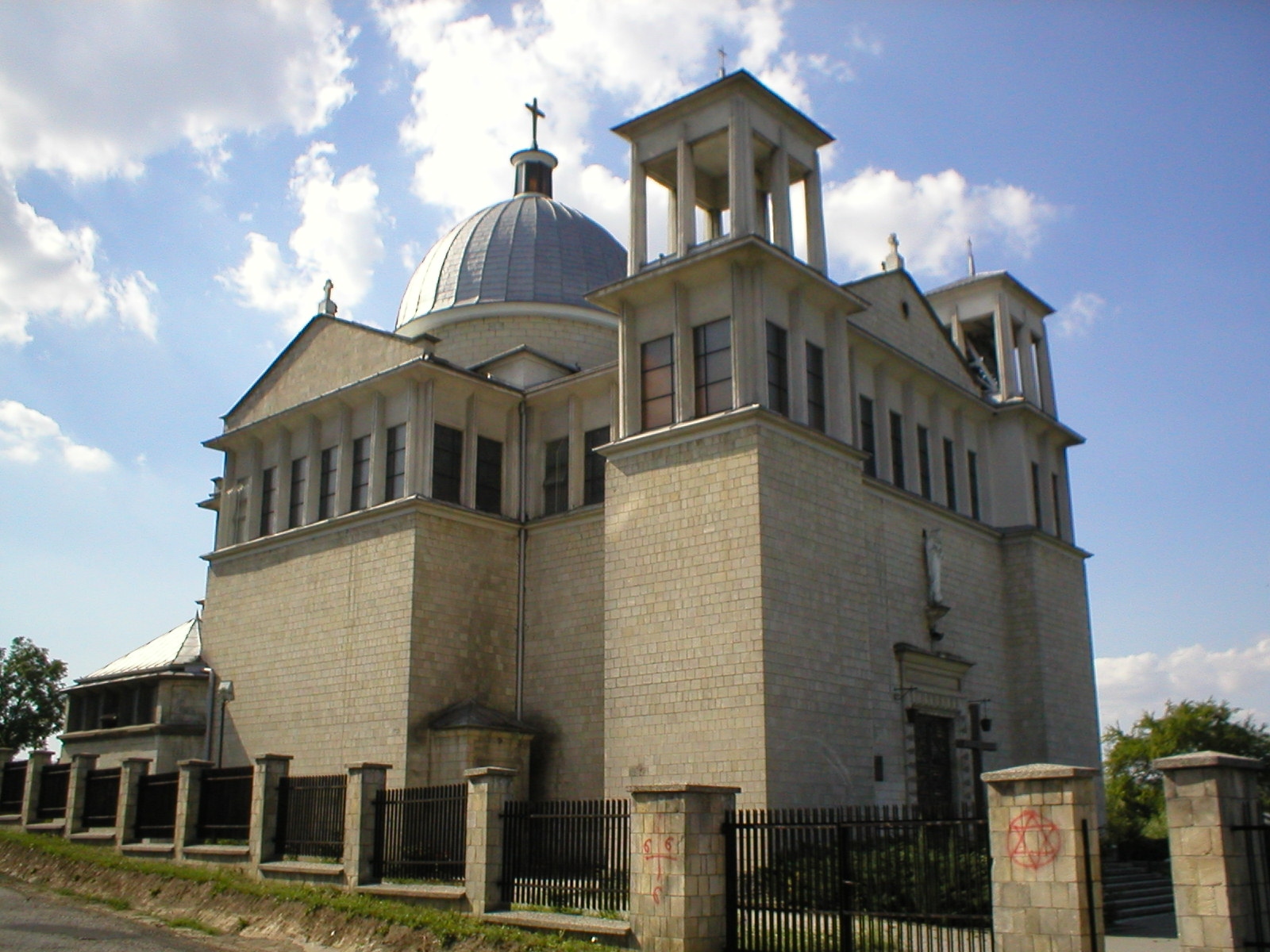
- Church of Our Lady the Queen of Poland

- Location within Poland
- Coordinates: 50°9′49″N 19°58′47″E
- Country: Poland
- Voivodeship: Lesser Poland
- County: Kraków
- Gmina: Michałowice

Population
  - Total: 1,600
- Website: http://www.michalowice.malopolska.pl

Michałowice [mixawɔˈvit͡sɛ] is a village in Kraków County, Lesser Poland Voivodeship, in southern Poland. It is the seat of the gmina (administrative district) called Gmina Michałowice.

== Gallery ==
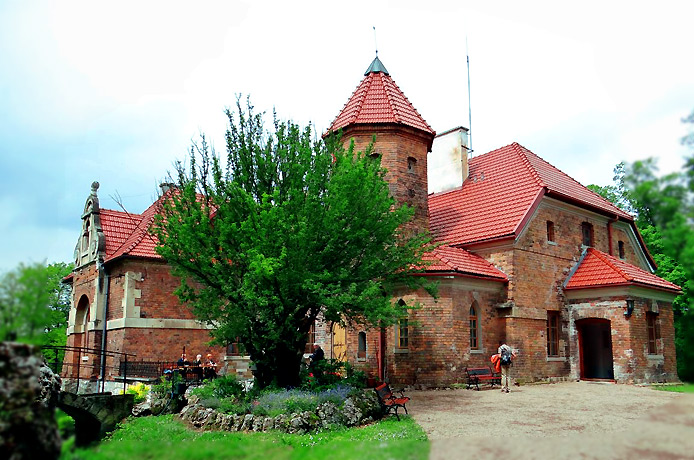
Dąbrowski Manor in Michałowice
