= Gmina Michałowice, Lesser Poland Voivodeship =

Gmina Michałowice Michałowice Commune
- Gmina
- Flag Coat of arms
- Interactive map of Gmina Michałowice
- Coordinates (Michałowice): 50°9′49″N 19°58′47″E
- Country: Poland
- Voivodeship: Lesser Poland
- County: Kraków County
- Seat: Michałowice

Area
  - Total: 51.27 km^{2} (19.80 sq mi)

Population (2006)
  - Total: 7,729
  - Density: 150.8/km^{2} (390.4/sq mi)
- Website: https://www.michalowice.malopolska.pl

Gmina Michałowice is a rural gmina (administrative district) in Kraków County, Lesser Poland Voivodeship, in southern Poland. Its seat is the village of Michałowice, which lies approximately 12 kilometres (7 mi) north of the regional capital Kraków.

The gmina covers an area of 51.27 square kilometres (19.8 sq mi), and as of 2006 its total population is 7,729.

The gmina contains part of the protected area called Dłubnia Landscape Park.

== Villages ==
Gmina Michałowice contains the villages and settlements of Firlejów, Górna Wieś, Kończyce, Kozierów, Książniczki, Masłomiąca, Michałowice, Młodziejowice, Pielgrzymowice, Prawda, Raciborowice, Sieborowice, Więcławice Dworskie, Wilczkowice, Wola Więcławska, Zagórzyce Dworskie, Zdziesławice and Zerwana.

== Neighbouring gminas ==
Gmina Michałowice is bordered by the city of Kraków and by the gminas of Iwanowice, Kocmyrzów-Luborzyca and Zielonki.
