= 25 Złotych =

The Polish 25 Złotych coin is a denomination of Polish currency. In the year 2009 there is a scheduled issue of golden 25 zł coin - Poland's path to liberation: The election of 4 June 1989.
