= Prawda, Lesser Poland Voivodeship =

Prawda
- Village
- Location within Poland
- Coordinates: 50°8′10″N 20°2′25″E
- Country: Poland
- Voivodeship: Lesser Poland
- County: Kraków
- Gmina: Michałowice

Prawda [ˈpravda] is a village in the administrative district of Gmina Michałowice, within Kraków County, Lesser Poland Voivodeship, in southern Poland. The village is located in the historical region Galicia.
