= Pielgrzymowice, Lesser Poland Voivodeship =

Pielgrzymowice
- Village
- Location within Poland
- Coordinates: 50°8′53″N 20°2′55″E
- Country: Poland
- Voivodeship: Lesser Poland
- County: Kraków
- Gmina: Michałowice

Pielgrzymowice [pjɛlɡʐɨmɔˈvit͡sɛ] is a village in the administrative district of Gmina Michałowice, within Kraków County, Lesser Poland Voivodeship, in southern Poland.
