= Maria Minakowska =

Polish historian

Maria Jadwiga Minakowska
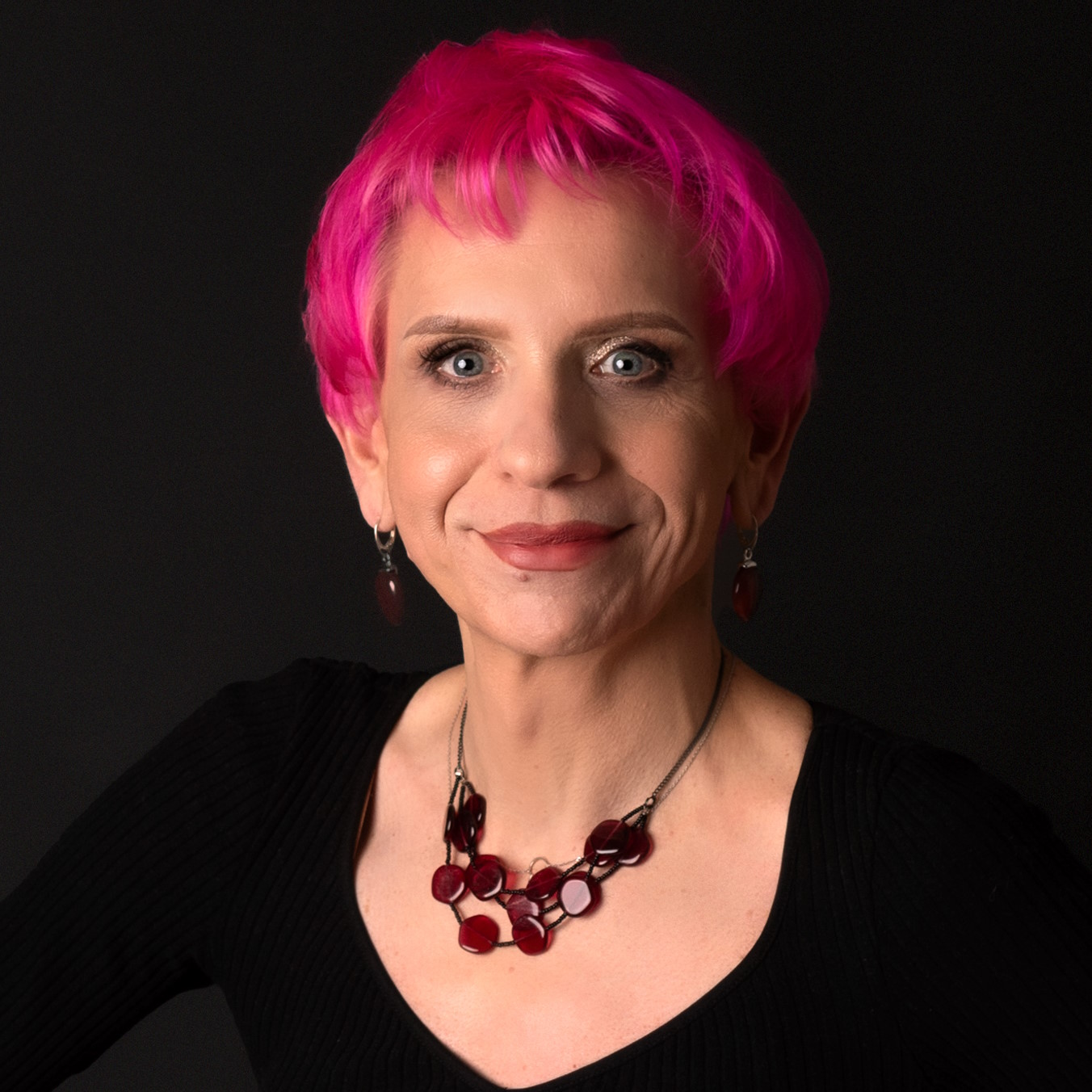
- Born: Marek Jerzy Minakowski; 13 June 1972 (age 54) Olsztyn, Polish People's Republic
- Education: Jagiellonian University: PhD
- Occupations: Historian and genealogist
- Awards: Decoration of Honor Meritorious for Polish Culture
- Website: minakowska.pl

Maria Jadwiga Minakowska (born June 13, 1972) is a Polish historian, genealogist and demographer creator of the Polish genealogy database Wielka Genealogia Minakowskiej (en. Minakowska's Great Genealogy). In 2024 Minakowska announced her transition from male to female.

== Biography ==
Minakowska was born as Marek Jerzy Minakowski in Olsztyn, Olsztyn Voivodeship into the family of Jerzy Minakowski and Wiesława, née Kraszewska. After graduating in philosophy from the Jagiellonian University, in 1998 she was awarded a PhD for a dissertation titled Formal logic prior to Aristotle, also in Kraków, under professor Ewa Żarnecka-Biały.

In 2001, she founded the Polish genealogy website Wielka Genealogia Minakowskiej based on extant historical records and data submitted by correspondents. By 2022, the site contained details of around 1 million people with ties to Poland. Based on the historic Great Sejm of 1788-1792, by 2022 Minakowska had assembled details of over 130,000 descendants of the participants of partitioned Poland's outgoing parliament, some of whom have been scattered across the globe. Minakowska focuses on "mass genealogy" whose research results are published on line and in print editions.

== Personal life ==
In 1994, being formally a male, she married archaeologist Anna Lebet-Minakowska (born 1963) and had a daughter together.

Minakowska's second forename, Jadwiga, refers to Hedwig of Silesia, to whom she claims to be distantly related. However, this claim has not been substantiated by independent research or reliable historical evidence.

She anticipates an era when women, no longer as burdened by child-bearing or rearing, will assume their rightful place in society.

== Award ==
In 2016, in recognition of her work, she received the Decoration of Honor Meritorious for Polish Culture.

== Publications ==
=== In Polish ===
- Adam Boniecki (heraldyk), Herbarz polski, Kraków 2005 (CD-ROM) ISBN 83-918058-1-6
- Ci wielcy Polacy to nasza rodzina, Kraków 2005 (CD-ROM), ISBN 83-918058-2-4
- Elita Rzeczypospolitej. Elita północnomazowiecka vol. I, Kraków 2011 ISBN 83-918058-9-1
- Elita Rzeczypospolitej. Elita wileńska vol. II, Kraków 2011 ISBN 978-83-63202-00-2
- Elita Rzeczypospolitej. Elita kresowa i smoleńska vol. III, Kraków 2011 ISBN 978-83-63202-01-9
- Elita Rzeczypospolitej. Elita krakowska senatorska vol. IV, Kraków 2012 ISBN 978-83-63202-02-6
- Elita Rzeczypospolitej. Elita sandomierska vol. V, Kraków 2012 ISBN 978-83-63202-03-3
- Elita Rzeczypospolitej. Elita poznańska senatorska vol. VI, Kraków 2012 ISBN 978-83-63202-04-0
- Elita Rzeczypospolitej. Elita krakowska poselska vol. VII, Kraków 2012 ISBN 978-83-63202-05-7
- Elita Rzeczypospolitej. Elita lubelska vol. VIII, Kraków 2012 ISBN 978-83-63202-06-4
- Elita Rzeczypospolitej. Elita litewska vol. IX, Kraków 2012 ISBN 978-83-63202-07-1
- Elita Rzeczypospolitej. Elita kijowska vol. X, Kraków 2012 ISBN 978-83-63202-08-8
- Elita Rzeczypospolitej. Elita żmudzka i nadniemeńska vol. XI, Kraków 2013 ISBN 978-83-63202-09-5
- Elita Rzeczypospolitej. Elita ruska vol. XII, Kraków 2013 ISBN 978-83-63202-10-1
- Elita Rzeczypospolitej. Elita koronna vol. XIII, Kraków 2013 ISBN 978-83-63202-11-8
- Elita Rzeczypospolitej. Elita inflacka vol. XIV, Kraków 2013 ISBN 978-83-63202-12-5
- Elita Rzeczypospolitej. Elita podlaska vol. XV, Kraków 2013 ISBN 978-83-63202-13-2
- Elita Rzeczypospolitej. Elita poznańska poselska vol. XVI, Kraków 2013 ISBN 978-83-63202-14-9
- Elita Rzeczypospolitej. Elita czernichowska vol. XVII, Kraków 2013 ISBN 978-83-63202-15-6
- Elita Rzeczypospolitej. Elita łęczycka i rawska vol. XVIII, Kraków 2015 ISBN 978-83-63202-16-3
- Elita Rzeczypospolitej. Elita kujawsa vol. XIX, Kraków 2015 ISBN 978-83-63202-17-0
- Elita Rzeczypospolitej. Elita płocka vol. XX, Kraków 2015 ISBN 978-83-63202-18-7

=== In English ===
- Minakowski, M.J.; Lebet-Minakowska, Anna (2018). "Jewish Birth and Marriage Registrations in 19th-century Cracow and What They Reveal about the Dynamics of Ritual Marriage" (PDF). Poland's Demographic Past 40 (2018). 40: 171–196. doi:10.18276/pdp.2018.40-08.
