= Prawda (surname) =

Prawda is a Polish surname meaning "truth". Notable people with the surname include:

- Andrzej Prawda (1951–2020), Polish football manager
- Christian Prawda (born 1982), Austrian footballer
- Marek Prawda (born 1956), Polish diplomat
