= Małopolska Institute of Culture =

Małopolska Institute of Culture Małopolski Instytut Kultury
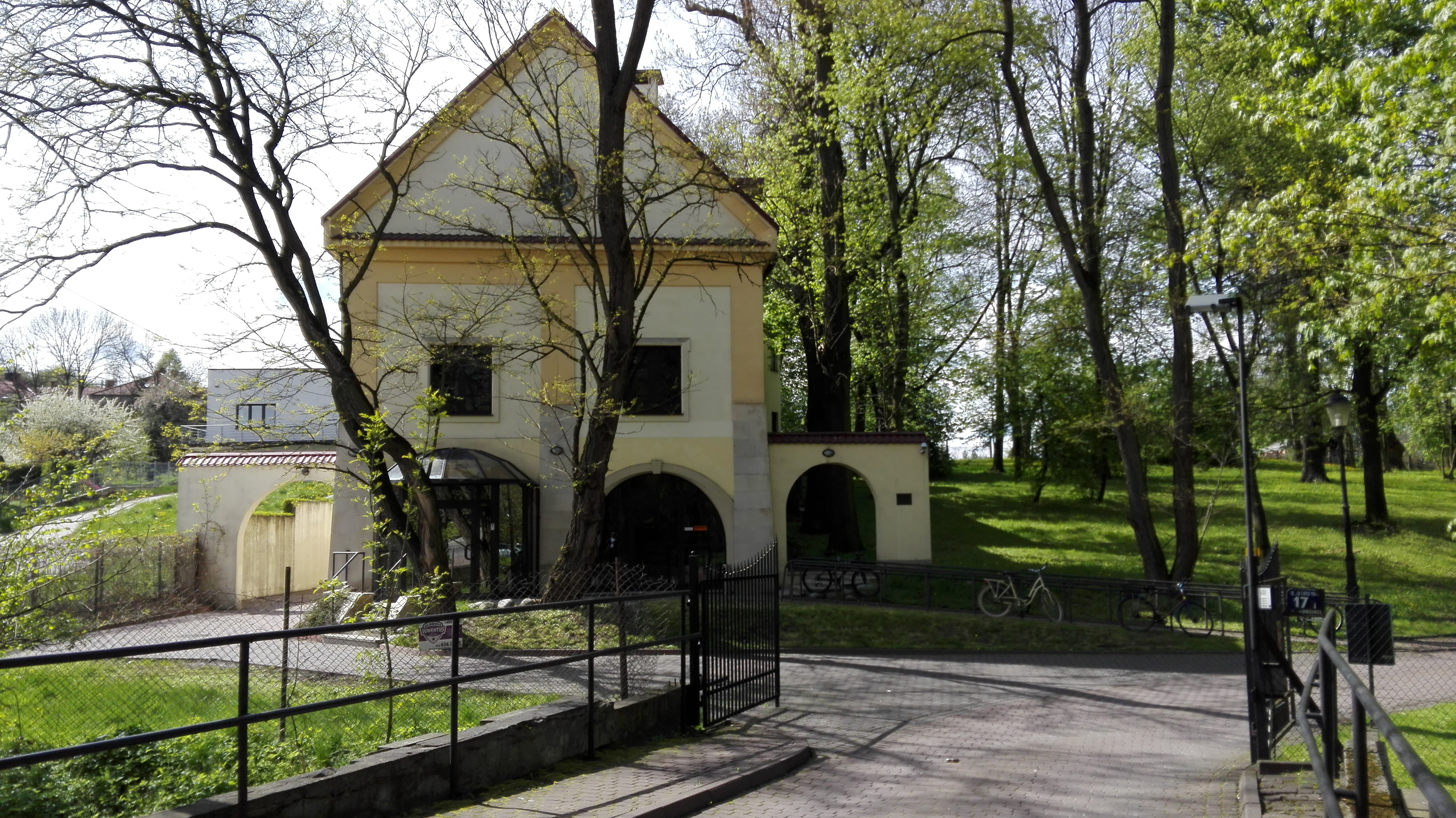
- Established: 2002
- Location: Kraków, Poland
- Type: Cultural institute
- Director: Joanna Orlik
- Website: mik.krakow.pl

The Małopolska Institute of Culture (Polish: Małopolski Instytut Kultury) is a regional cultural institution engaged in promoting and supporting the culture of Małopolska (Lesser Poland). The institute was founded in 2002 and is located in Kraków. Its main focus is integrating diverse small regional cultural institutions - museums, archives or local cultural centres.

The Institute organises events and initiatives to promote the culture of Małopolska both locally and abroad. One of them is Małopolska's Virtual Museums, a digitisation project in which over 700 artworks and objects from 35 small museums were photographed and made available online.

== Małopolska Days of Cultural Heritage ==
The Institute runs numerous annual programs, such as the Małopolska Region Days in Brussels and the Małopolska Days of Cultural Heritage, an event meant to promote the cultural diversity of Malopolska. Each May, for two weekends the Institute organises a series of curated visits to ten cultural sites of special interest where educational activities and sightseeing take place. The selected heritage sites (churches, palaces, factories, private buildings) are little known or normally out of bounds to the public (due to private ownership or other considerations)
