= Lesser Poland Way =

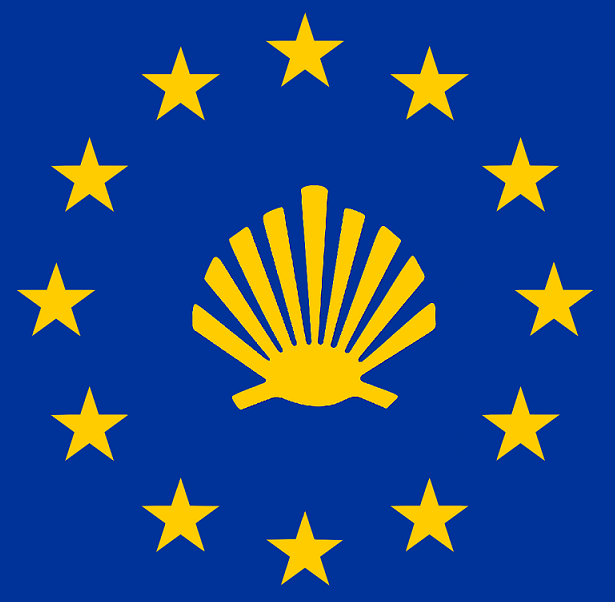
The symbol of the way surrounded by EU flag stars

The Lesser Poland Way is one of the Polish routes of the Way of St. James, a medieval pilgrimage route to Santiago de Compostela in Spain. It runs from Sandomierz to Kraków through the Lesser Poland Voivodeship and the Świętokrzyskie Voivodship. It is an alternative path of the main Via Regia that in the Middle Ages ran from Estonia through Vilnius, Grodno and Lublin. The Lesser Poland Way was partially reopened on 25 October 2008. The whole route was reopened on 25 October 2009. Another feeder route ran from Tarnobrzeg.

== The route ==
The traditional starting point in Sandomierz was the Dominican Church of St. James in Sandomierz, Sanctuary of blessed Sadok and 48 Dominican martyrs. The aim was to pass towns or villages with churches dedicated to the Apostle James, stopping at Kraków, where there is no St. James' church, before joining other international routes.

=== Places with St. James church ===
Between Sandomierz and Kraków there are four places with a St. James' church:

- Szczaworyż at distance:31 km
- Pałecznica, distance: 25 km
- Niegardów, distance: 19 km
- Stare Więcławice, distance: 20 km

== Santiago de Compostela ==
From Kraków it is possible to go to Santiago by two initial routes. Either using the Via Regia through Opole and Wrocław onto Germany. The alternative is through Oświęcim, Żory and Racibórz then onto the Czech Republic.

== Gallery ==
The modern symbol of the way

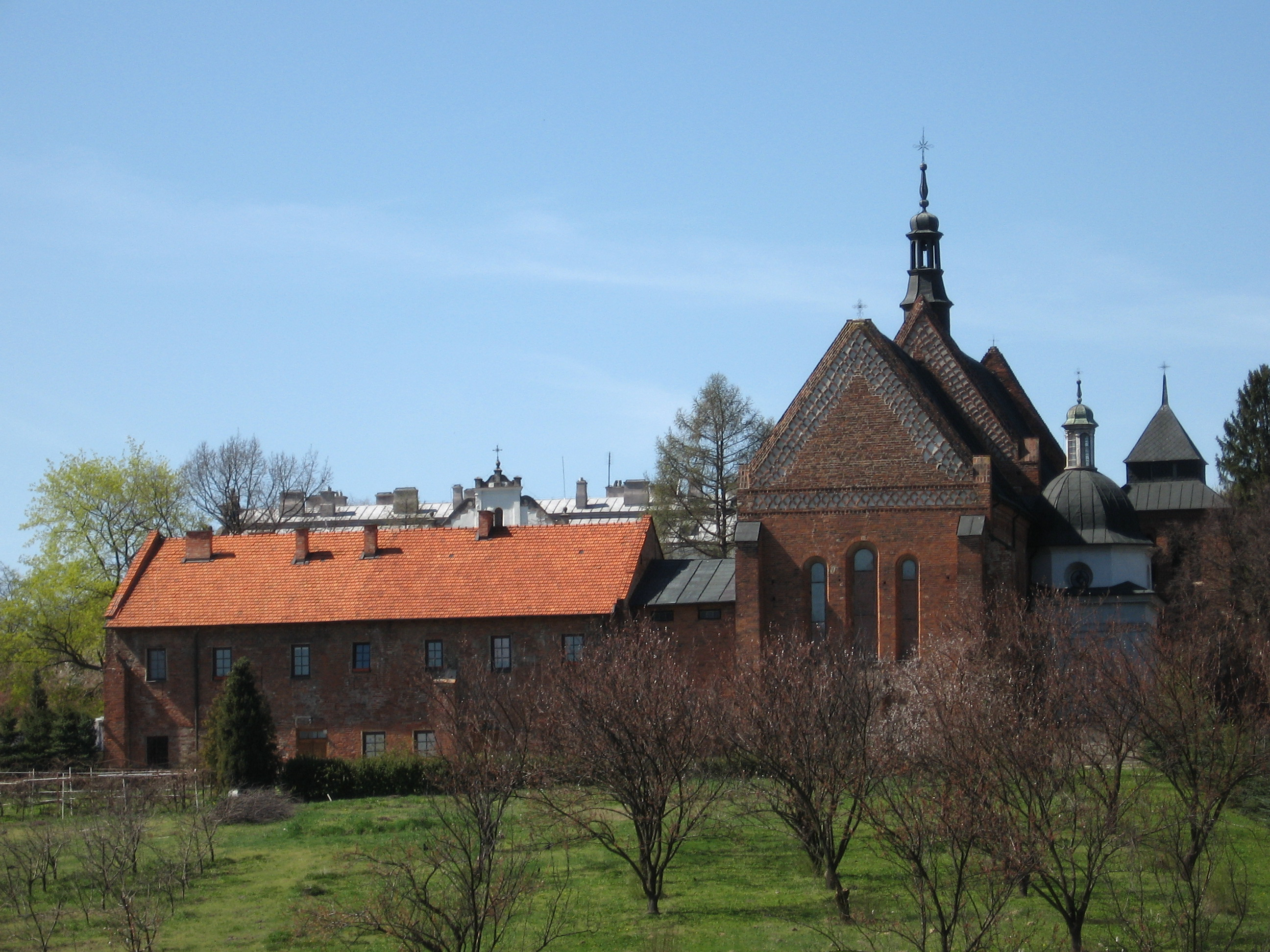
Sandomierz

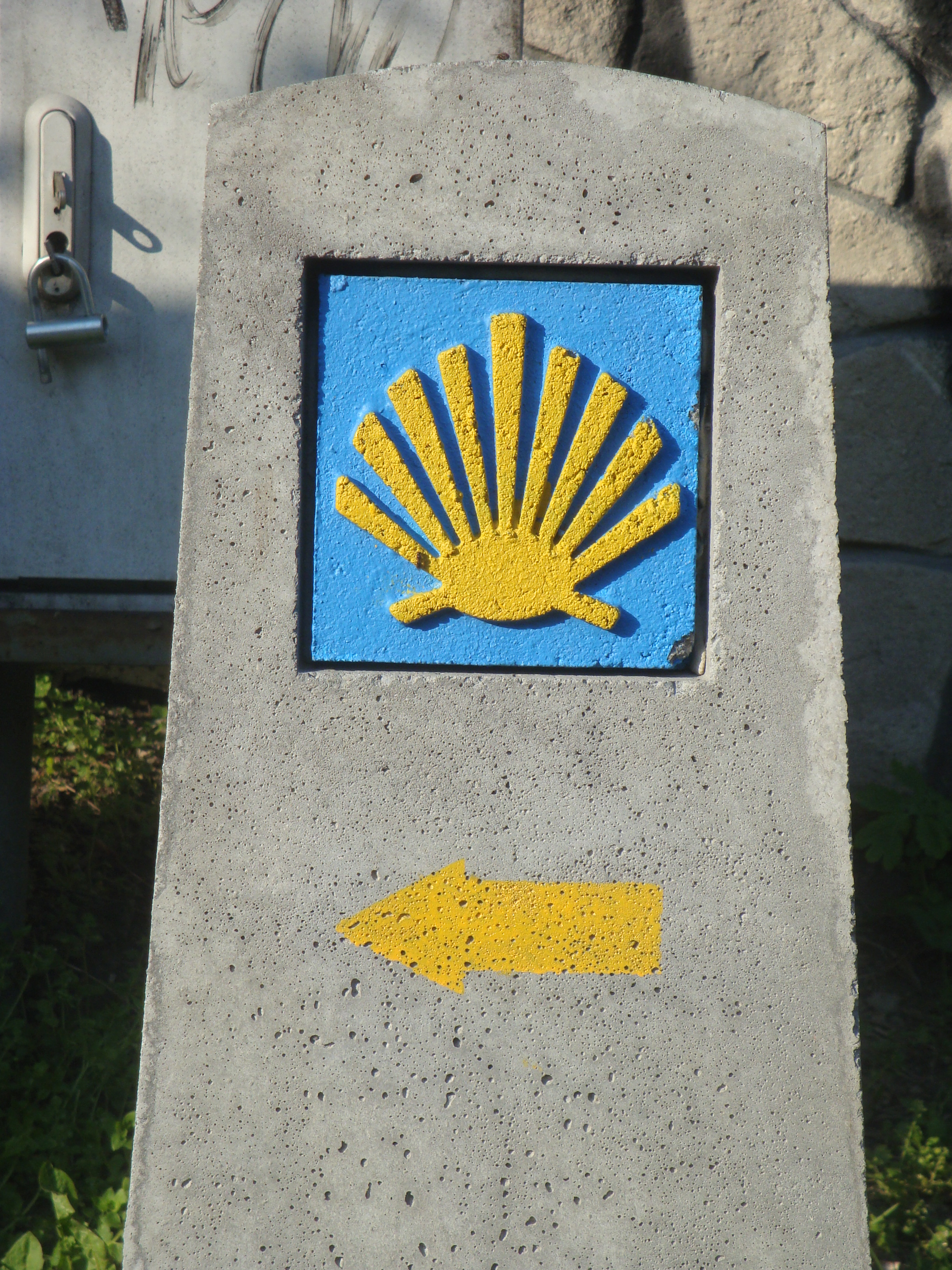
at St. James Church in Sandomierz

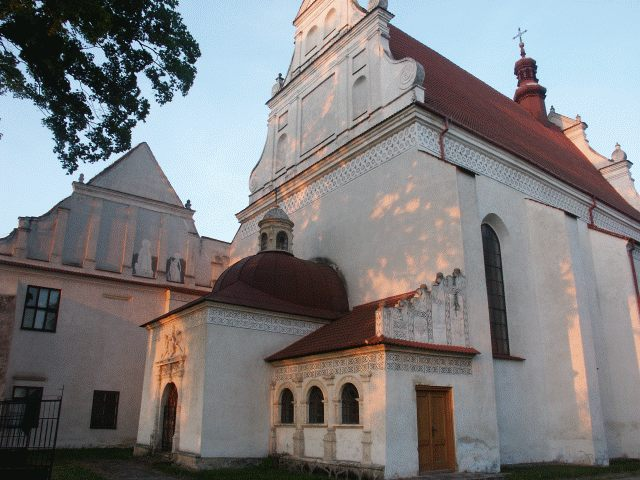
Klimontów

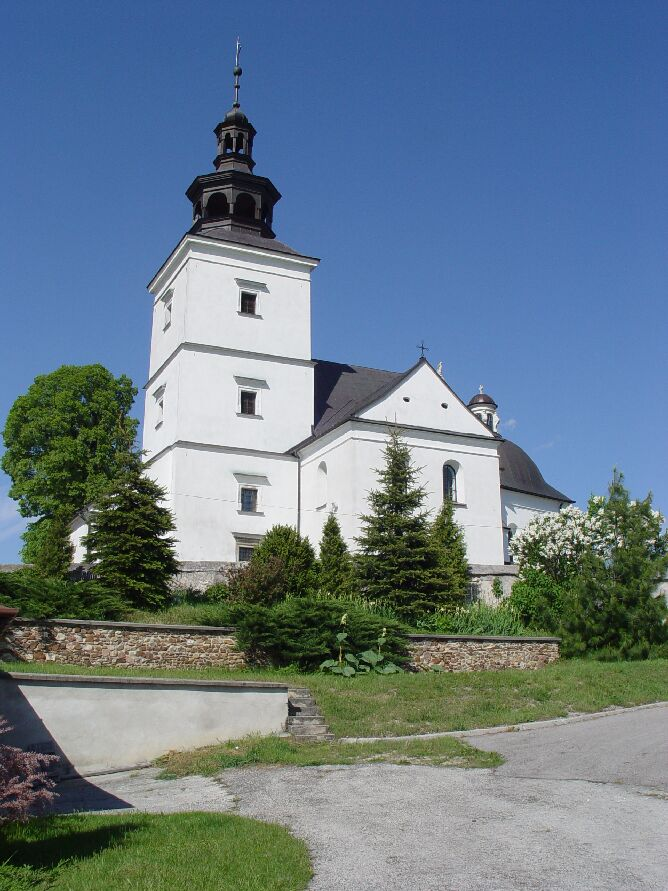
Szczaworyż

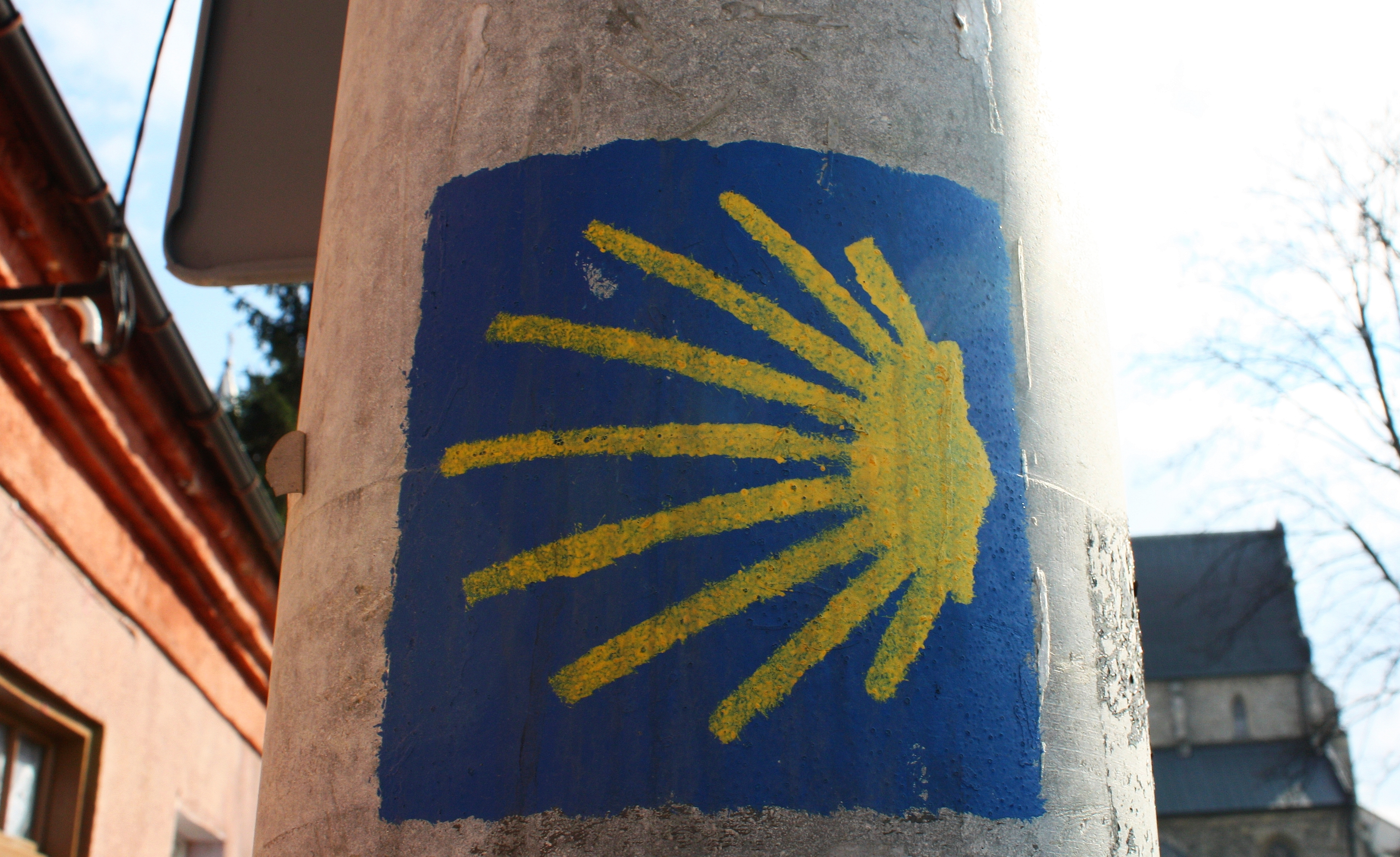
Skalbmierz

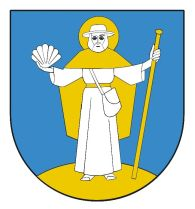
Pałecznica

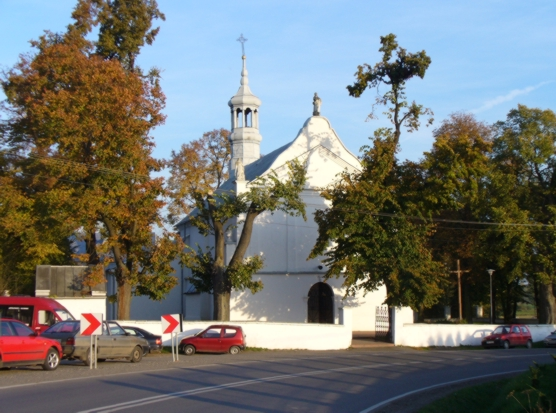
Niegardów

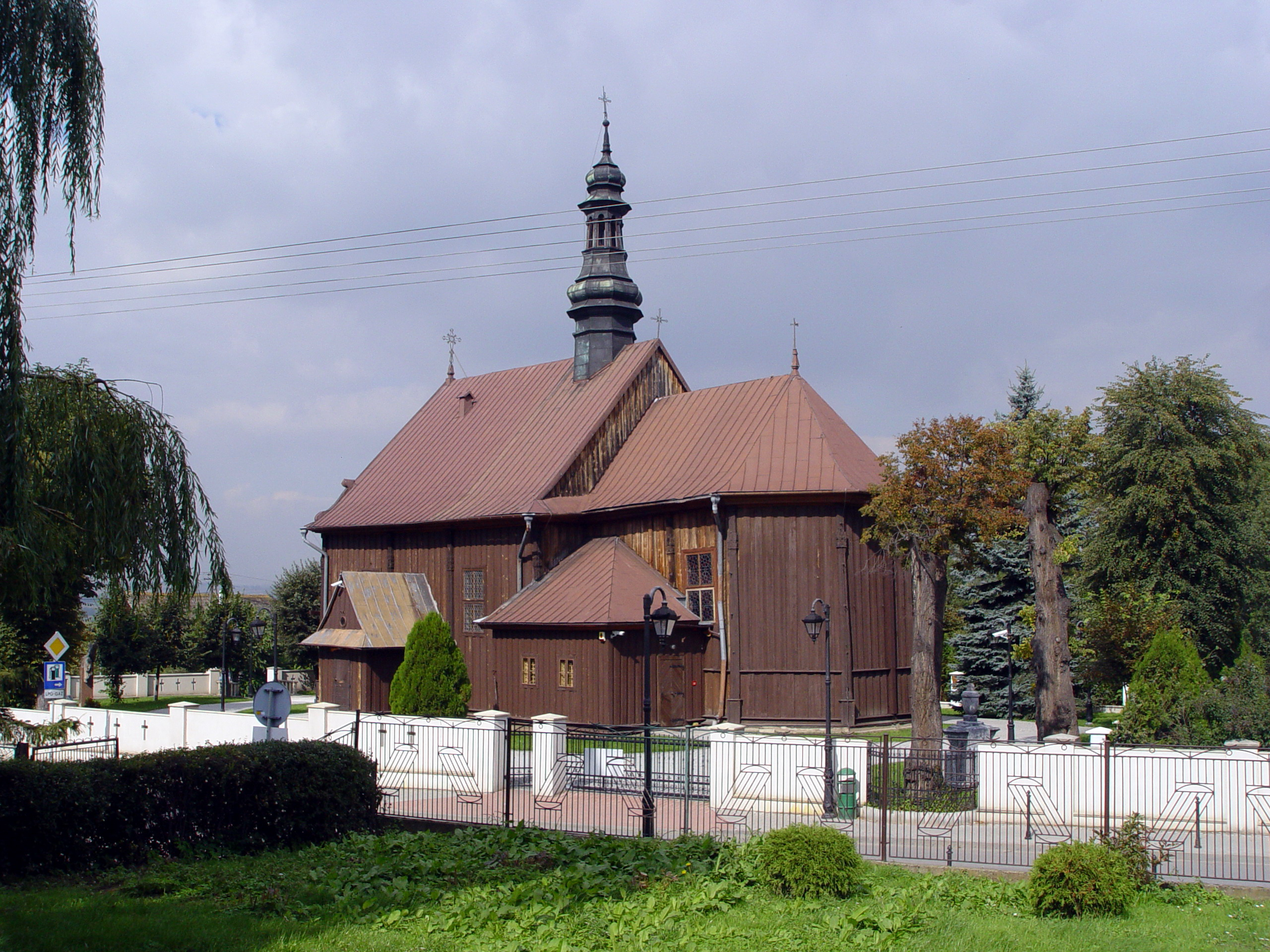
Więcławice

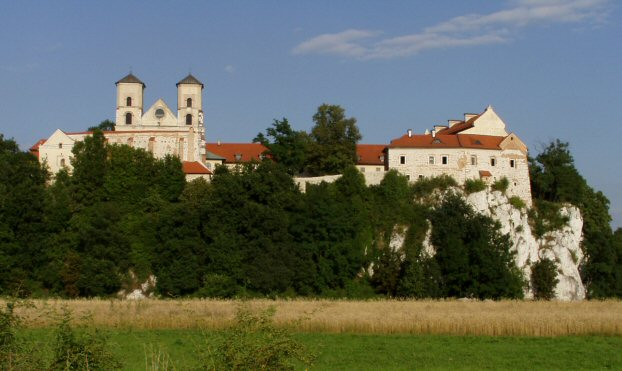
Kraków - Tyniec

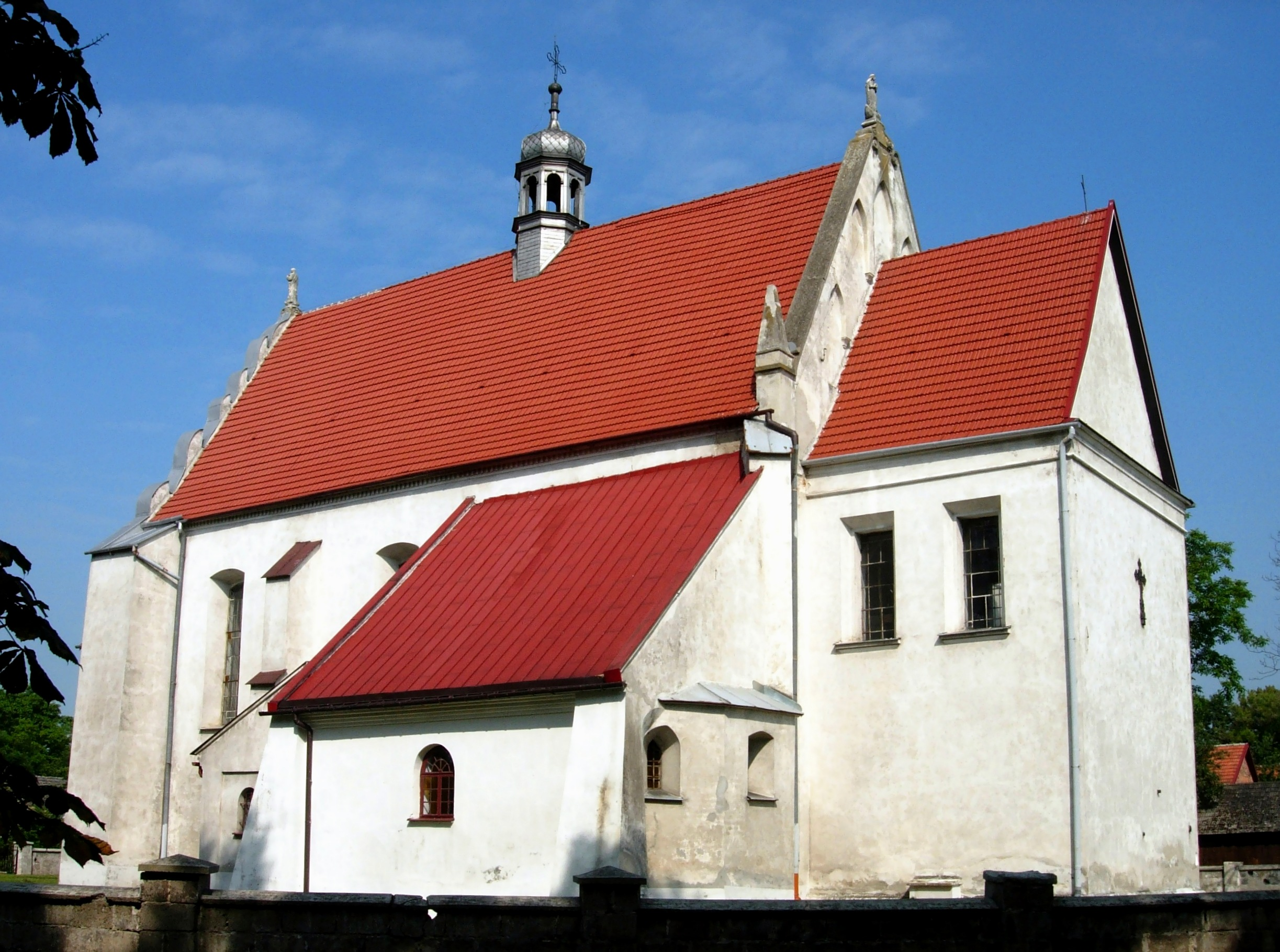
Opatowiec

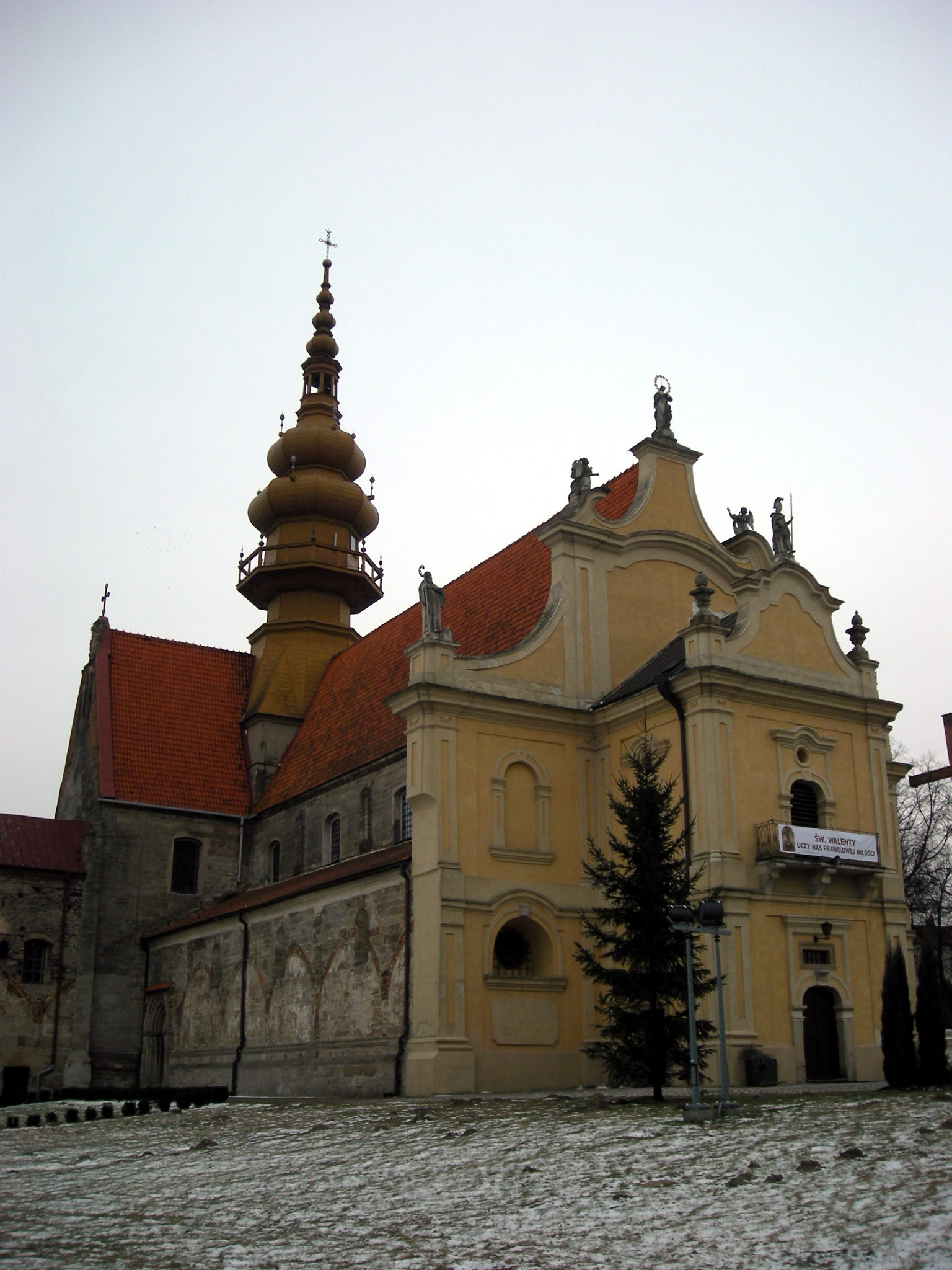
Koprzywnica
