= Church of the Holy Trinity, Kraków (Kazimierz) =

Roman Catholic church in Kraków, Poland

Church of the Holy Trinity
- Kościół Świętej Trójcy
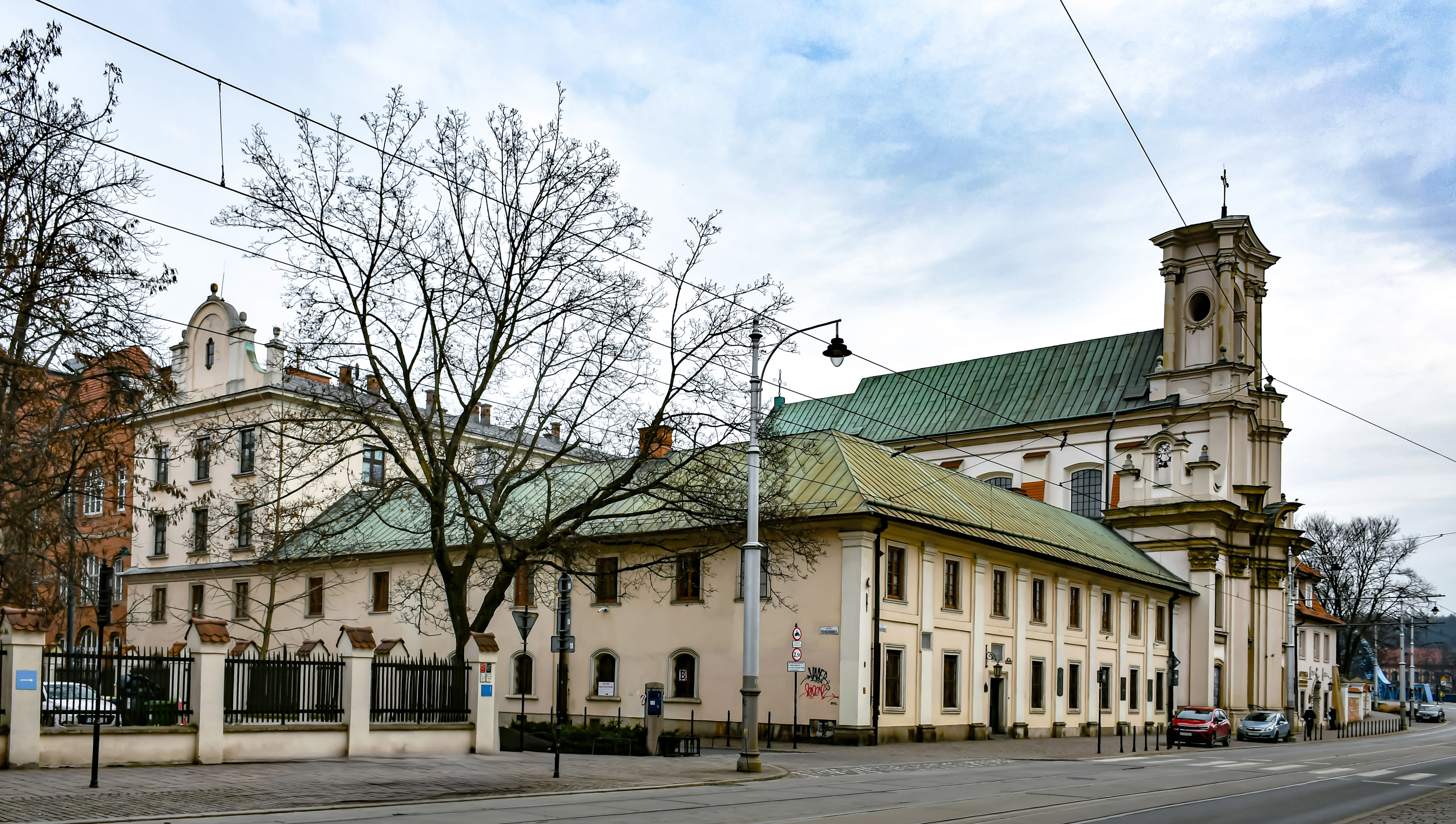
- From right to left, church, monastery and old hospital of the Brothers Hospitallers of Saint John of God. View from Krakowska Street.
- Church of the Holy Trinity
- 50°02′49.5″N 19°56′39″E
- Location: Kraków
- Address: 48 Krakowska Street
- Country: Poland
- Denomination: Roman Catholic
- Website: bonifratrzy.pl/klasztor-krakow/

History
- Consecrated: 1758

UNESCO World Heritage Site
- Type: Cultural
- Criteria: iv
- Designated: 1978
- Part of: Historic Centre of Kraków
- Reference no.: 29
- Region: Europe and North America

Historic Monument of Poland
- Designated: 1994-09-08
- Part of: Kraków historical city complex
- Reference no.: M.P. 1994 nr 50 poz. 418

The Church of the Holy Trinity (Polish: Kościół Świętej Trójcy), known colloquially as the Brothers Hospitallers of Saint John of God Church (Polish: Kościół bonifratrów) is a historic Roman Catholic conventual and hospital church of the Brothers Hospitallers of Saint John of God located at 48 Krakowska Street in Kazimierz, the former district of Kraków, Poland.

== History ==
The church, monastery and hospital was built for the Order of the Most Holy Trinity and of the Captives (Trinitarians) between 1741 and 1758, designed by Francesco Placidi. The church was consecrated in 1758 by Bishop Franciszek Potkański, suffragan of Kraków. In 1796 the last monk died, the order was abolished and the buildings were taken over by the Austrian army as warehouses.

In 1812, Frederick Augustus I of Saxony, Duke of Warsaw, handed over the complex to the Order of Brothers Hospitallers.

In 3 Trynitarska Street, the Brothers Hospitallers built a new hospital in 1897 and 1906, designed by Teodor Talowski.

After World War II, the hospital was taken over by the state. In 1996, the buildings were returned to the order.

== Architecture ==
The church is oriented. The Baroque façade designed by Francesco Placidi. Church has a three naves and late Baroque interior. In the main altar there is a sculpture of Jesus of Nazareth, consecrated in 1759 by Pope Clement XIII and given to the Trinitarians.

Illusionistic decorations and fresco are the work of artist from Moravia - Joseph Piltz. On the vault there is a scene of the ransom of slaves by the founder of the Trinitarian order, John of Matha.

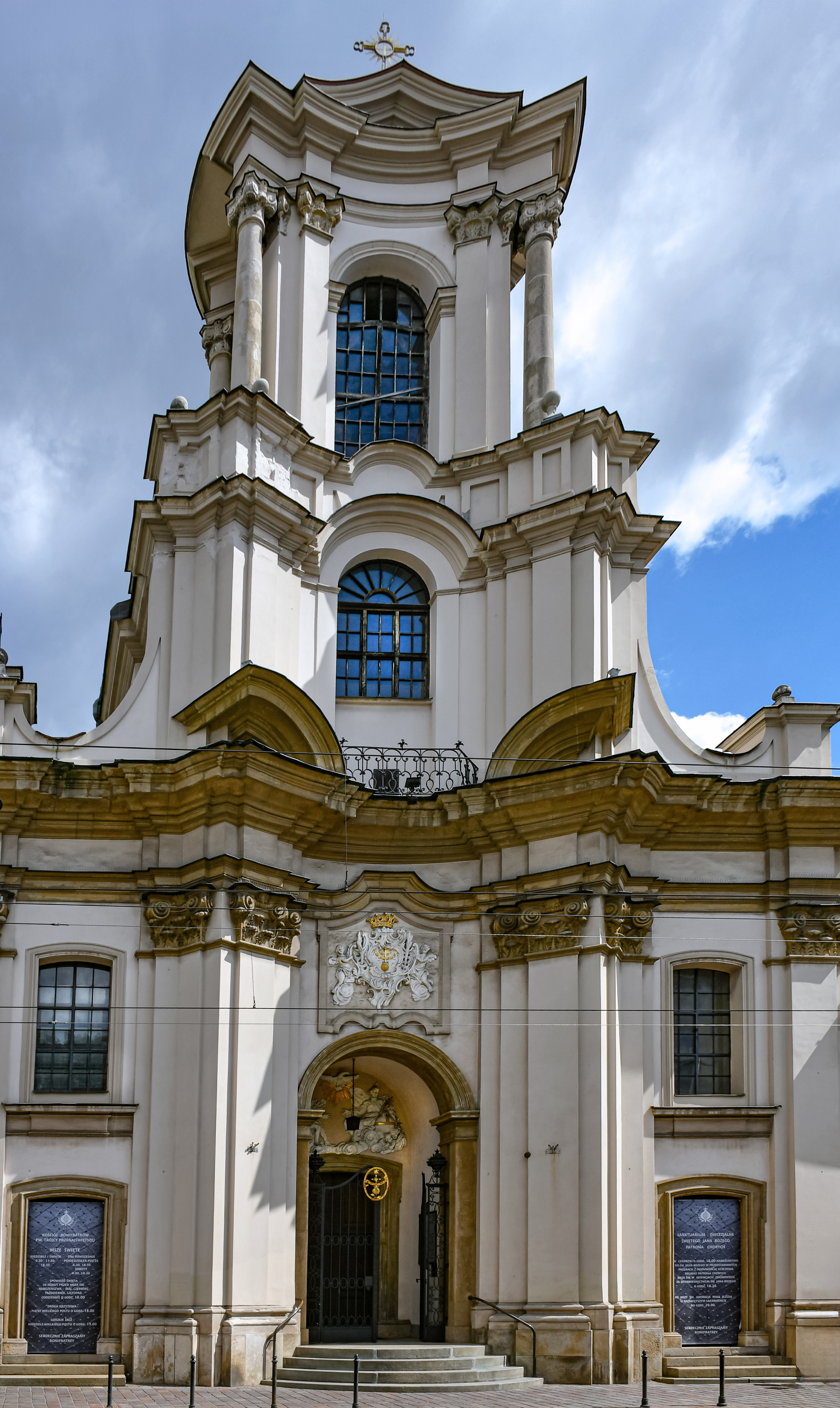
Façade

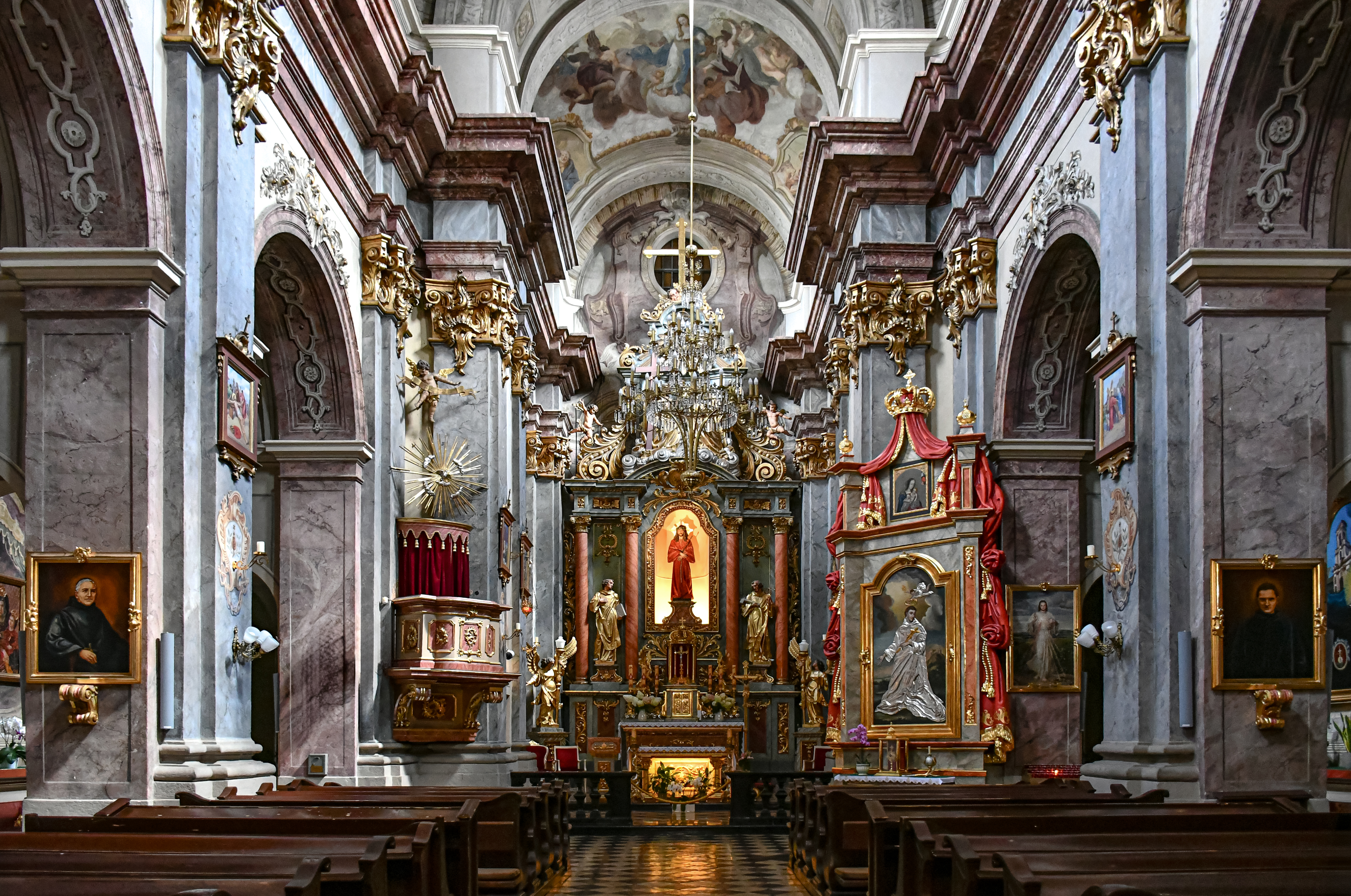
Main nave

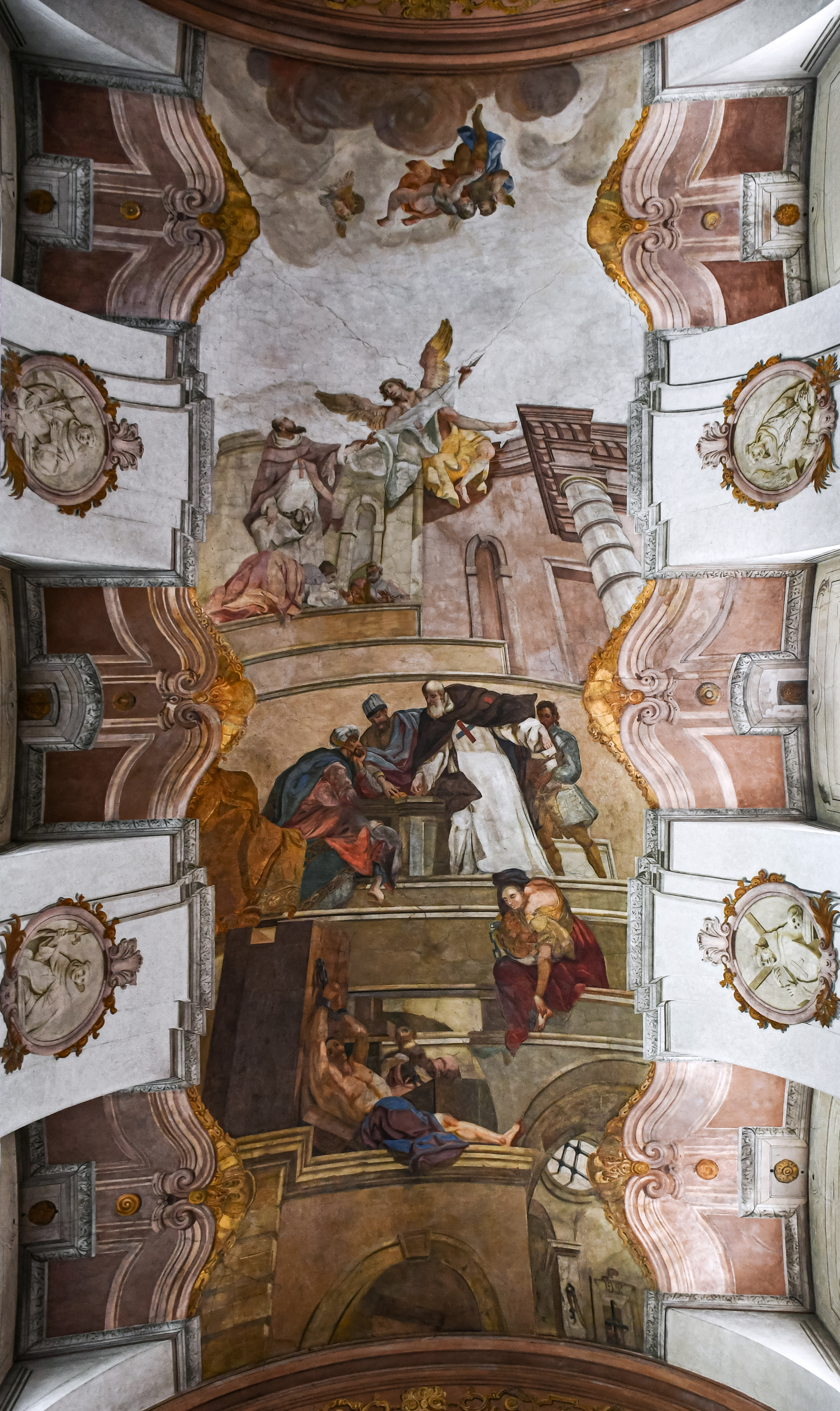
Vault

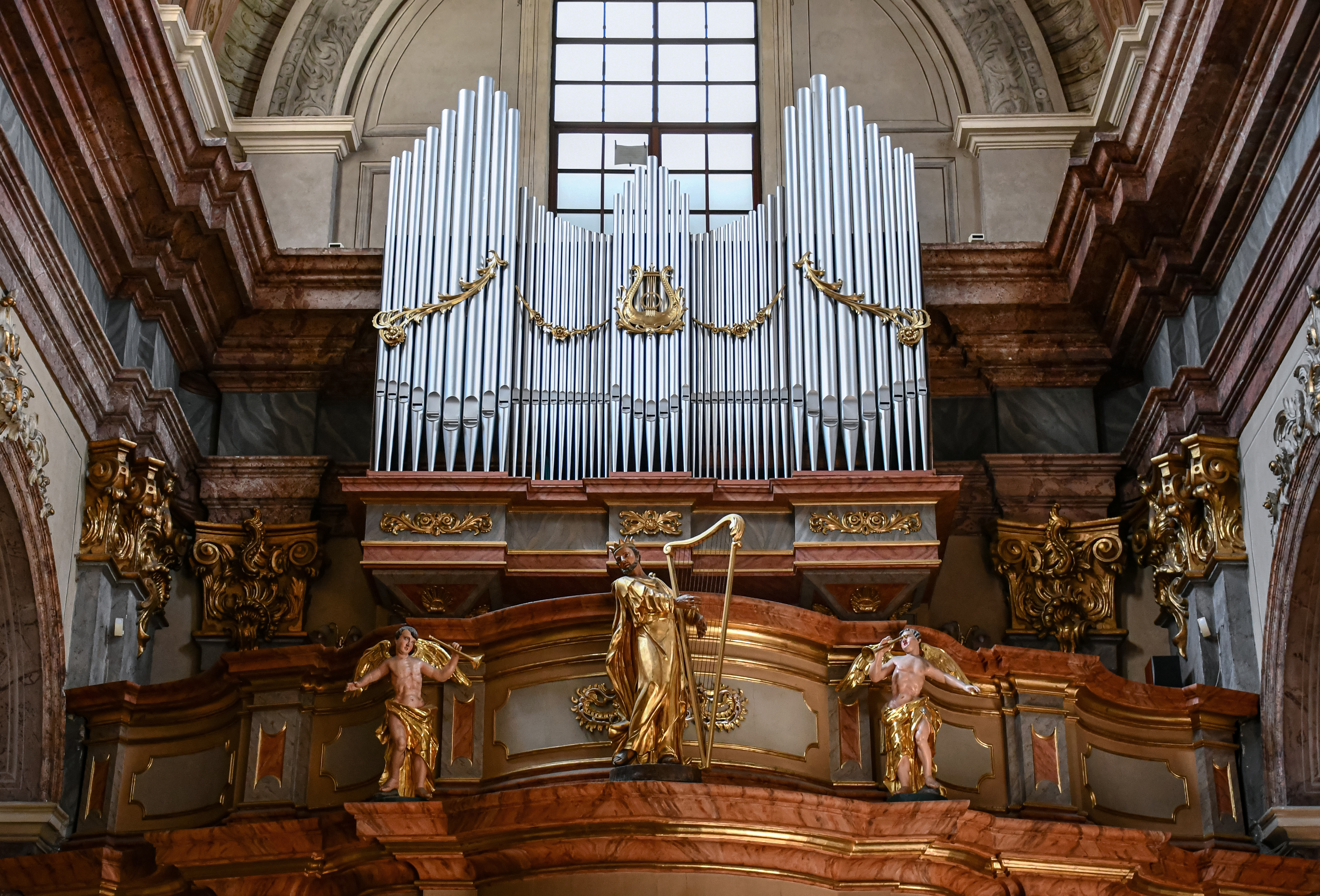
Pipe organ

== Bibliography ==
- (in Polish) Michał Rożek, Barbara Gądkowa Leksykon kościołów Krakowa, Wydawnictwo Verso, Kraków 2003, ISBN 83-919281-0-1 pp. 177-178 (Lexicon of Krakow churches)
- (in Polish) Praca zbiorowa Encyklopedia Krakowa, wydawca Biblioteka Kraków i Muzeum Krakowa, Kraków 2023, ISBN 978-83-66253-46-9 volume I page 758 (Encyclopedia of Krakow)
