= Church of St. Mary of the Perpetual Assistance, Ternopil =

Destroyed Roman Catholic church in Ternopil, Ukraine

Coordinates: 49.5533°N 25.5947°E

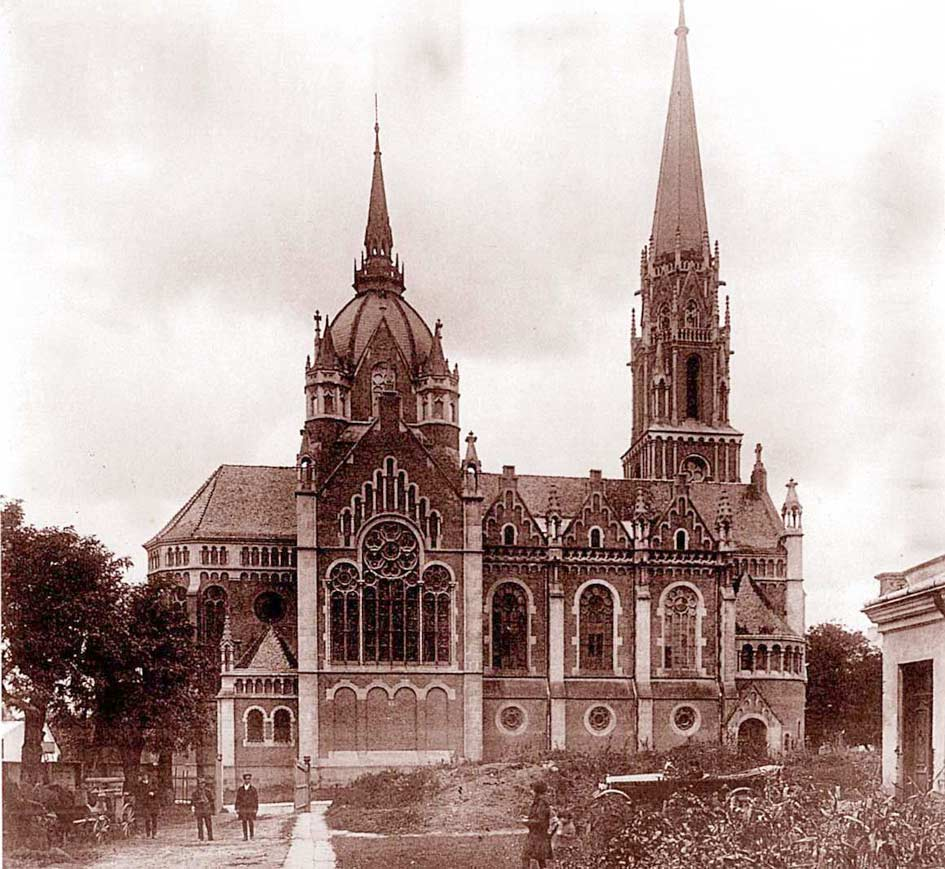
Church of St. Mary of the Perpetual Assistance in Tarnopol

The Church of St. Mary of the Perpetual Assistance located in Tarnopol, Eastern Galicia (now Ternopil, Ukraine), was a church located in the city's centre which functioned as the parish church of Ternopil's Roman Catholic community.

The church was built by the Latin Deacon of Ternopil and local rector, prelate Bolesław Twardowski, in the years 1903–1908, as a parish church for the city. The design of the neo-gothic church was made by Teodor Talowski. It was one of his alternative projects for the Church of St. Elizabeth in Lviv.

As a result of World War II, the city was annexed by the Soviet Union. The local Polish Catholic population was transferred or expelled in line with the new Polish frontier. The local Soviet authorities decided to demolish the church, and on their orders it was blown up in 1954. Later, a department store was erected on the site.

== The history of construction ==
The construction began with the creation of a committee in 1897 that began collecting voluntary donations. Charity concerts and festivals were organized. The funds for the "skeleton" of the building and two altars alone amounted to 250000 crowns. It was planned that 200856 crowns would be provided by the city authorities, 104285 crowns would be covered by competition - a special tax on the building, and 123000 crowns would come from voluntary donations.

A design competition was held for the construction of St. Elizabeth's Church in Lviv, and the winner was a design by Professor of the Lviv Polytechnic Institute Teodor Talowski (1857–1910), a well-known architect of his time, a graduate of the Vienna and Lviv Polytechnics, and a student of the Lviv architect Julian Zacharewicz. The church in Ternopil was a "twin" of the Lviv church in terms of style and many structural elements.

On 8 September 1904, the mayor of Ternopil, cs. Bolesław Twardowski consecrated the cornerstone of the building. The crowded ceremony was attended by processions from the surrounding villages: Bila, Dovzhanka, Domamorych, Dychkiv, Velykyi Hlybochok, Ivanivka, Kurovets, Kutkovets and Pronyatyn. Stefan Neuhoff, a railroad engineer, took charge of all the work on the church's construction. The work was carried out quite briskly. Interesting technical solutions were used to make the building stronger and lighter. In May 1908, newspapers reported on the consecration of a cross on the dome of the church, which was blessed by the Marianist wife of the ladies. In November of the same year, the city council purchased an altar with a coat of arms for 3000 crowns.

On 11 November 1908, the parish church was solemnly dedicated and the parish officially moved from the Dominican Church (now the Cathedral of the Immaculate Conception of the Blessed Virgin Mary) to the newly built church. The bells were consecrated the day before. The interior of the shrine became increasingly rich. In 1909–1910, a generous gift was received from Ludwik Punchert - marble statues of the crucified Jesus Christ and the Mother of God. In 1911, the pediment of the building was decorated with another beautiful gift - marble statues of the Evangelist John and St. Joseph by the famous Lviv carver Petro Voitovych. In 1912, a wonderful manger-shop was installed in the side chapel. Its author was the artist Bernard Yarosevych, a teacher at the Ternopil Real School. During the First World War, the church was destroyed. But the "wounds" were quickly healed. In 1933, the main altar was consecrated. It was designed by Lviv engineer and artist Vavzhynets Daichak. The carvings were made by carver Yanina Reichert, assisted by a talented self-taught artist, Ukrainian Nazarko. This is the story of the birth of this original building.
