= Zasów =

- Village
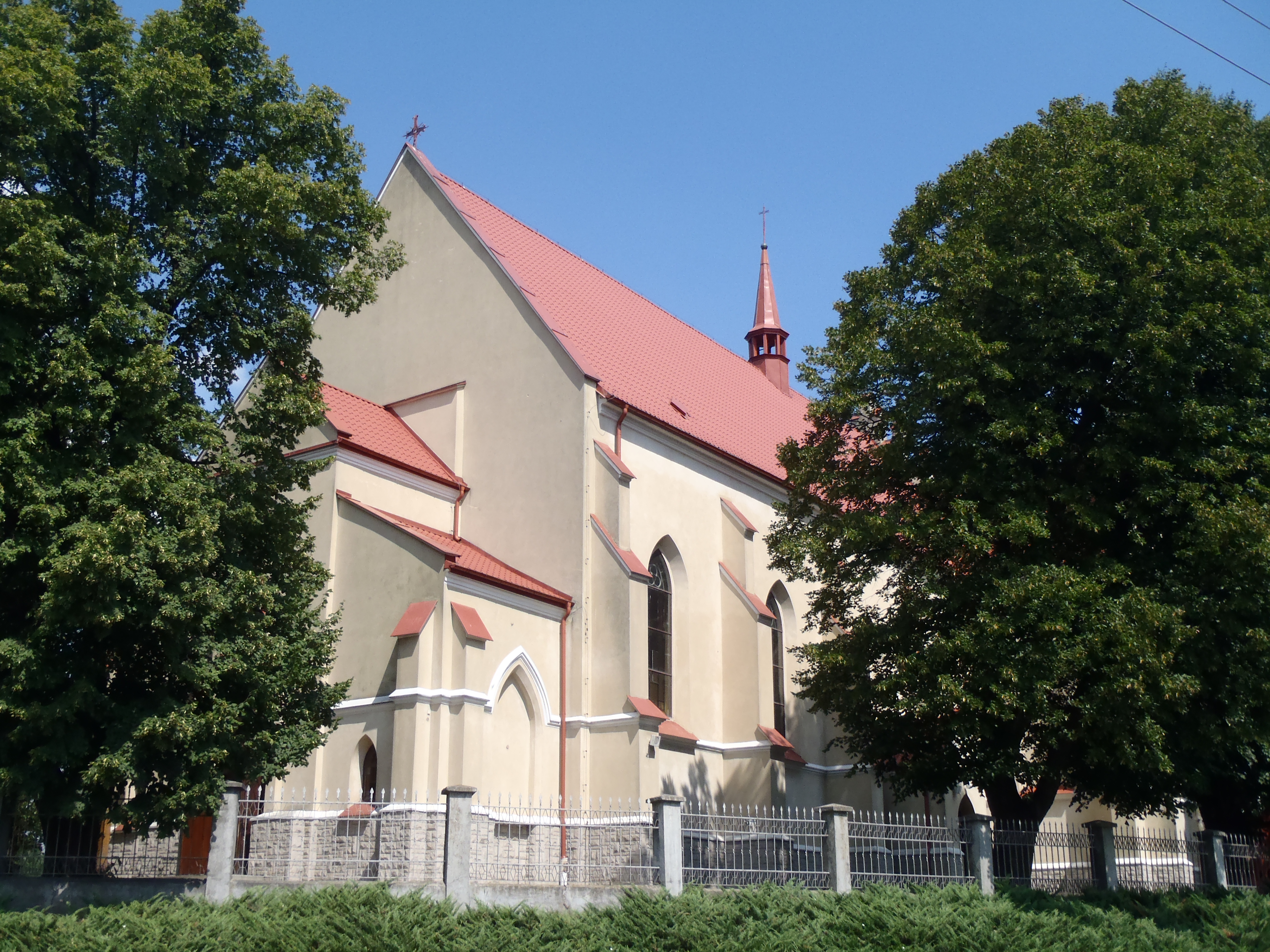
- Church of Saint Stanislaus

- Location within Poland
- Coordinates: 50°7′51″N 21°20′32″E
- Country: Poland
- Voivodeship: Subcarpathian
- County: Dębica
- Gmina: Żyraków

Population
  - Total: 864

Zasów [ˈzasuf] is a village in the administrative district of Gmina Żyraków, within Dębica County, Subcarpathian Voivodeship, in south-eastern Poland.

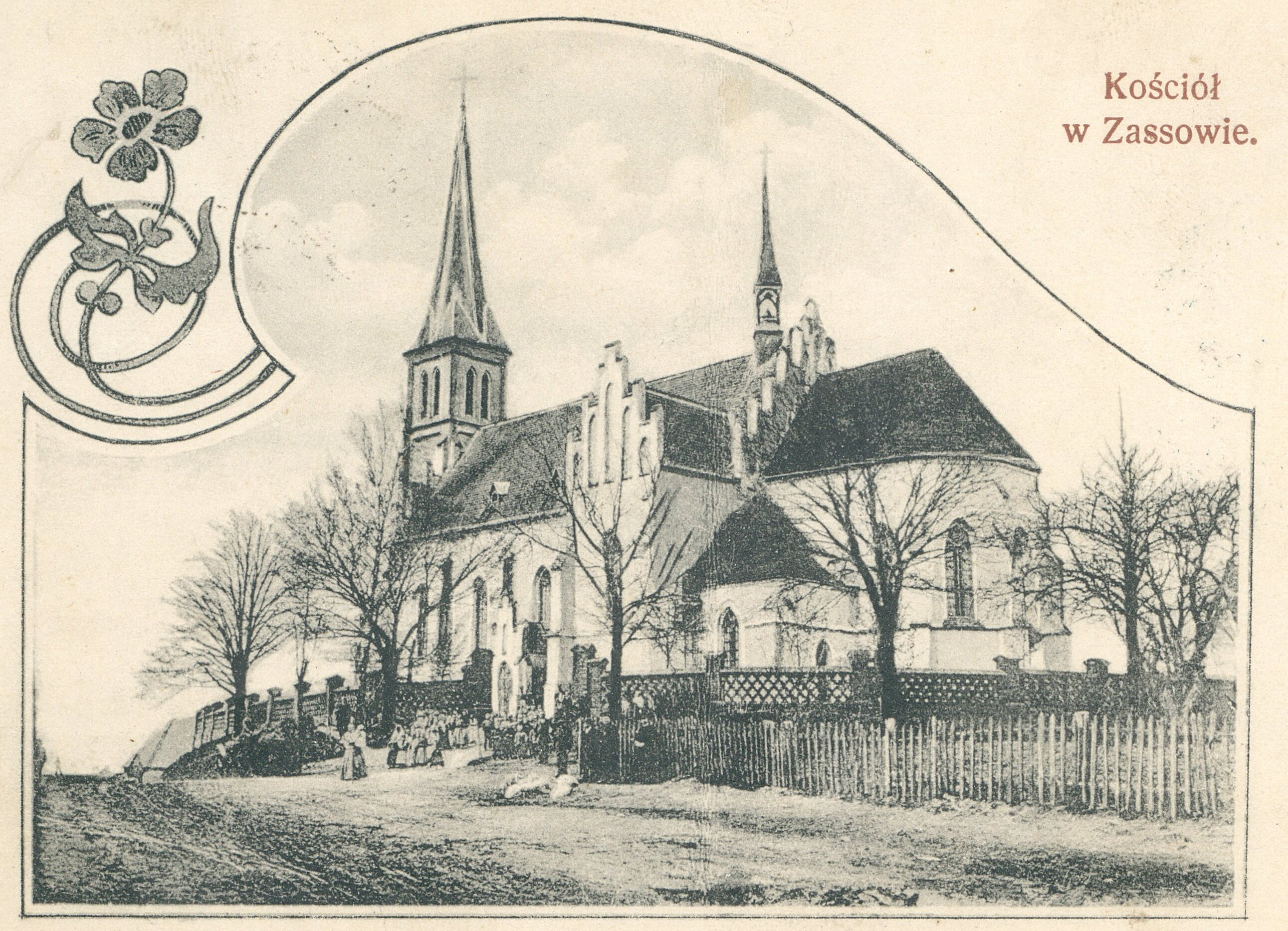
Church ca 1910

== Notable people ==
- Teodor Talowski, (1857-1910) Polish architect. Born in Zasów
