= Church of Sts. Olha and Elizabeth, Lviv =

Catholic church in Lviv, Ukraine

Coordinates: 49°50′13″N 24°0′18″E

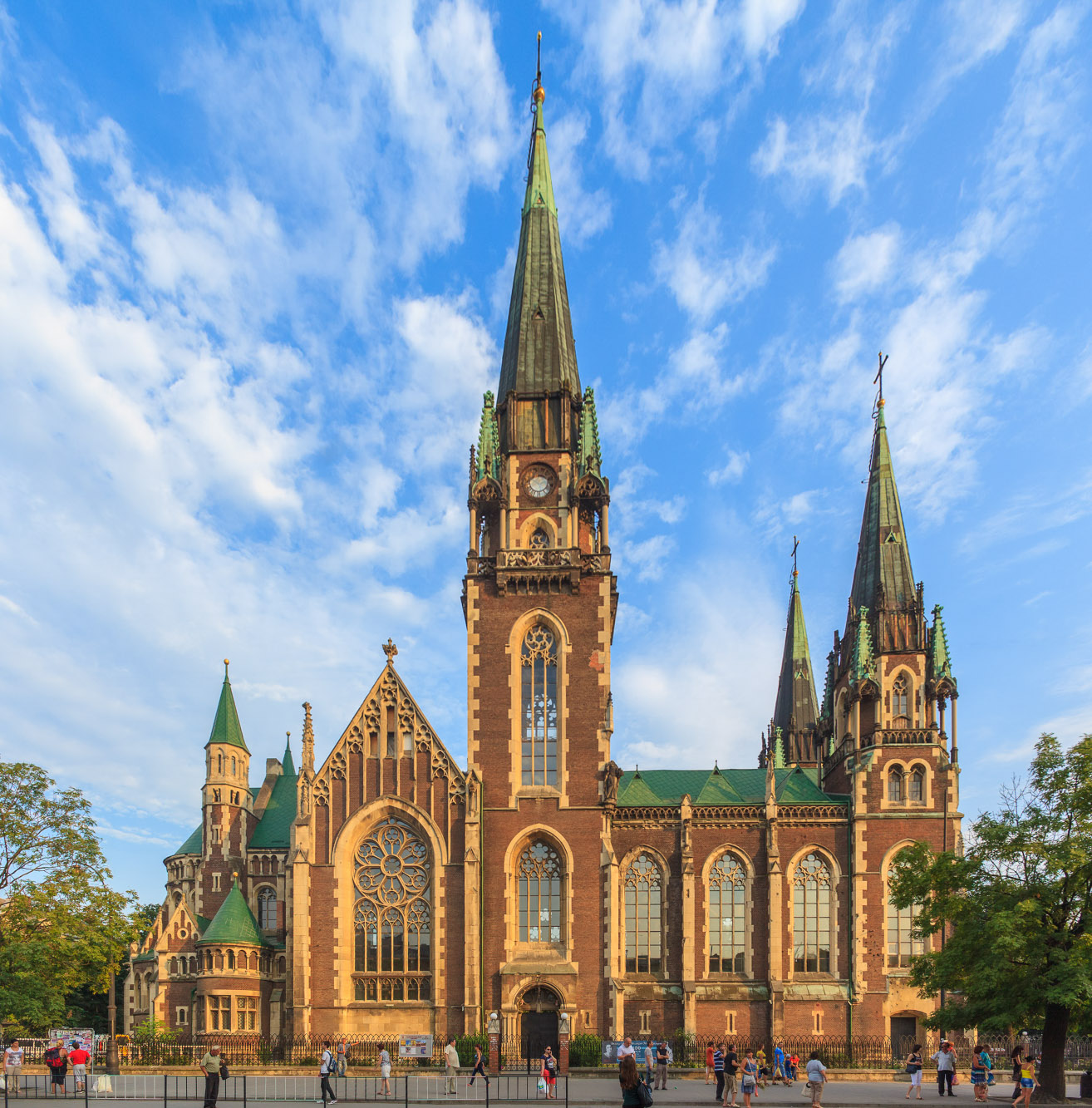
The facade and belltower

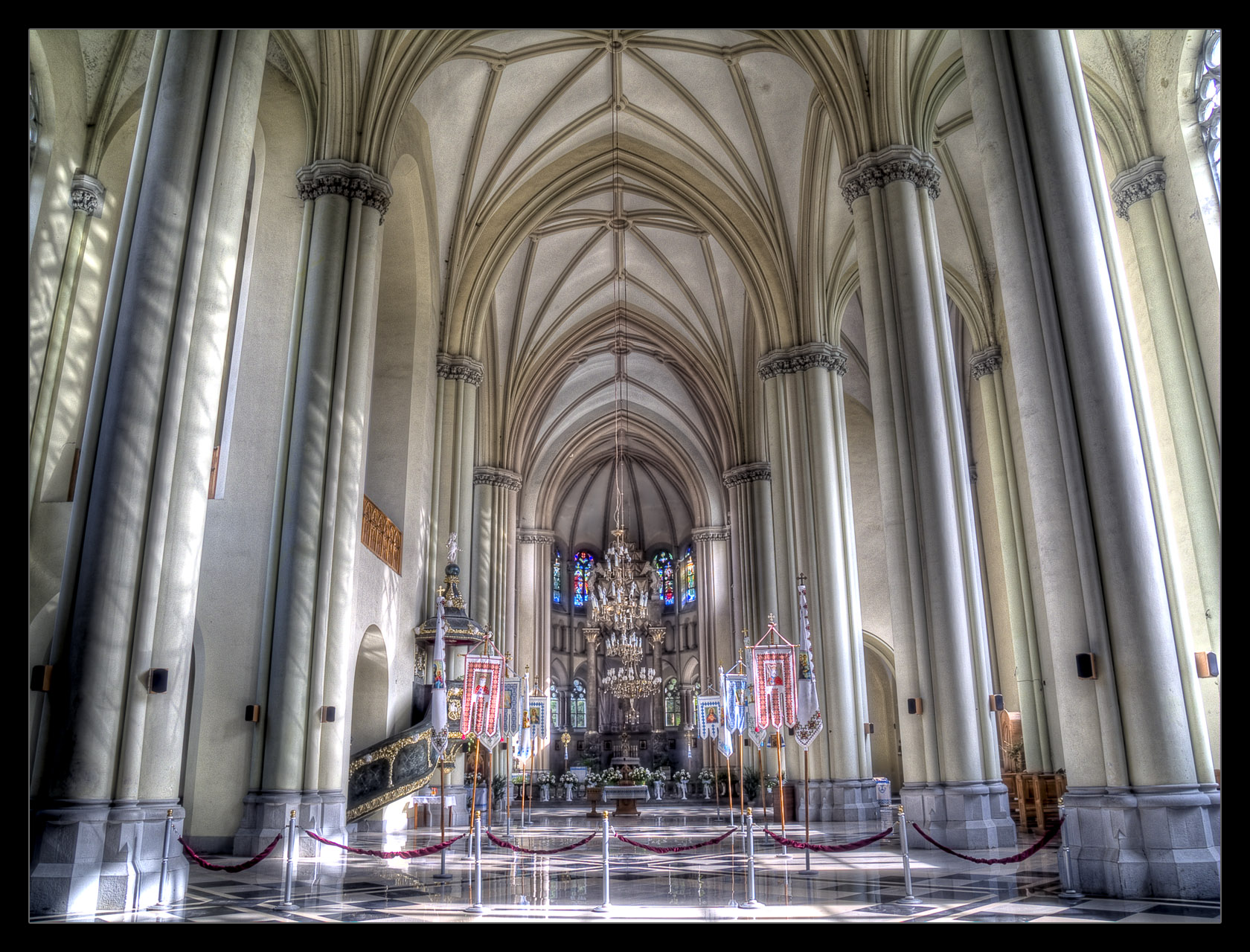
Rather bare interior with the preserved neo-Gothic ambo and marble art-deco altar

The Church of Sts. Olha and Elizabeth is a Catholic church located in Lviv, Ukraine between the city's main rail station and the Old Town. It was originally built as a Western Catholic church and today serves as a Ukrainian Greek Catholic church.

The church was built by the Latin Archbishop of Lviv, Józef Bilczewski in the years 1903–1911 as a parish church for the city's dynamically developing western suburb. It was designed by Polish architect Teodor Talowski, in the neo-Gothic style, similar to that of the Votive Church in Vienna. St. Elisabeth's, placed on a hill which is the watershed of the Baltic and Black Sea, with its facade flanked by two tall towers and an 85 m belfry on the north side with imposing spires was envisioned as Lviv's first landmark to greet visitors arriving in the city by train.

In 1939, the church was damaged in a bombing raid but remained open until 1946. After the war, the building was used as a warehouse and fell further into ruin, until it was returned to faithful with the collapse of the Soviet Union. In 1991, a Ukrainian Greek Catholic church was established and the church was reconsecrated as the Church of Sts. Olha and Elizabeth.

== Gallery ==
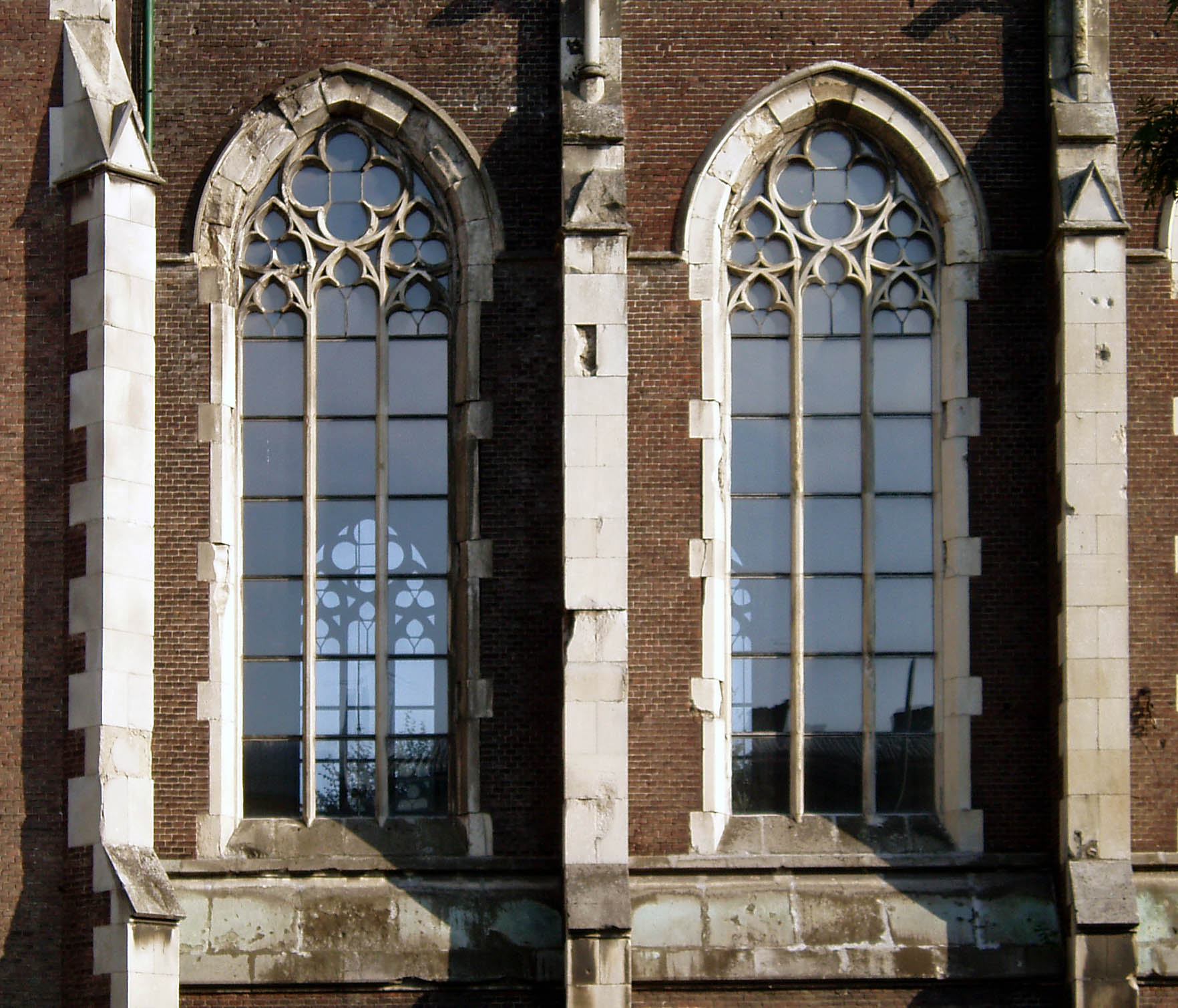

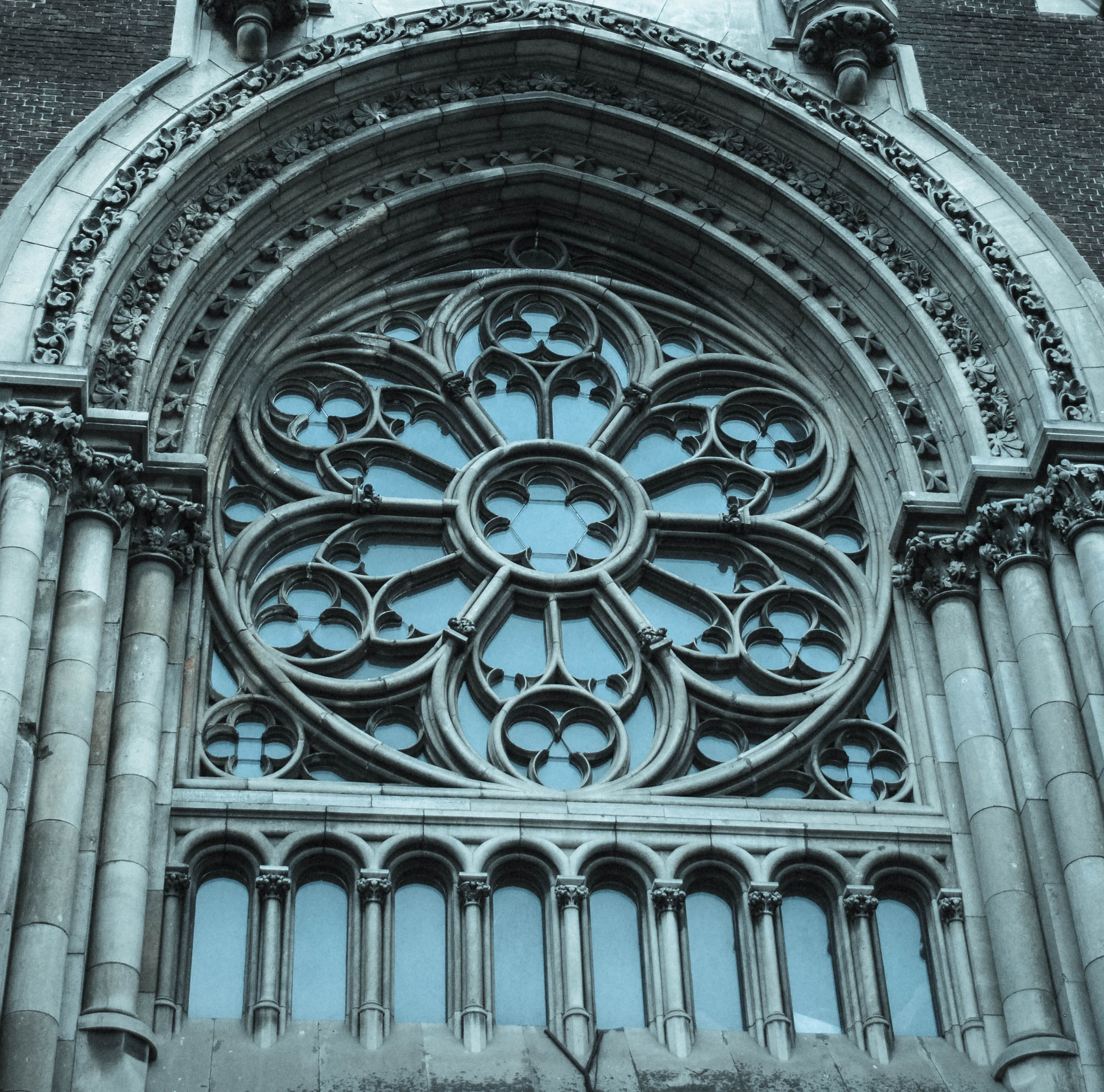

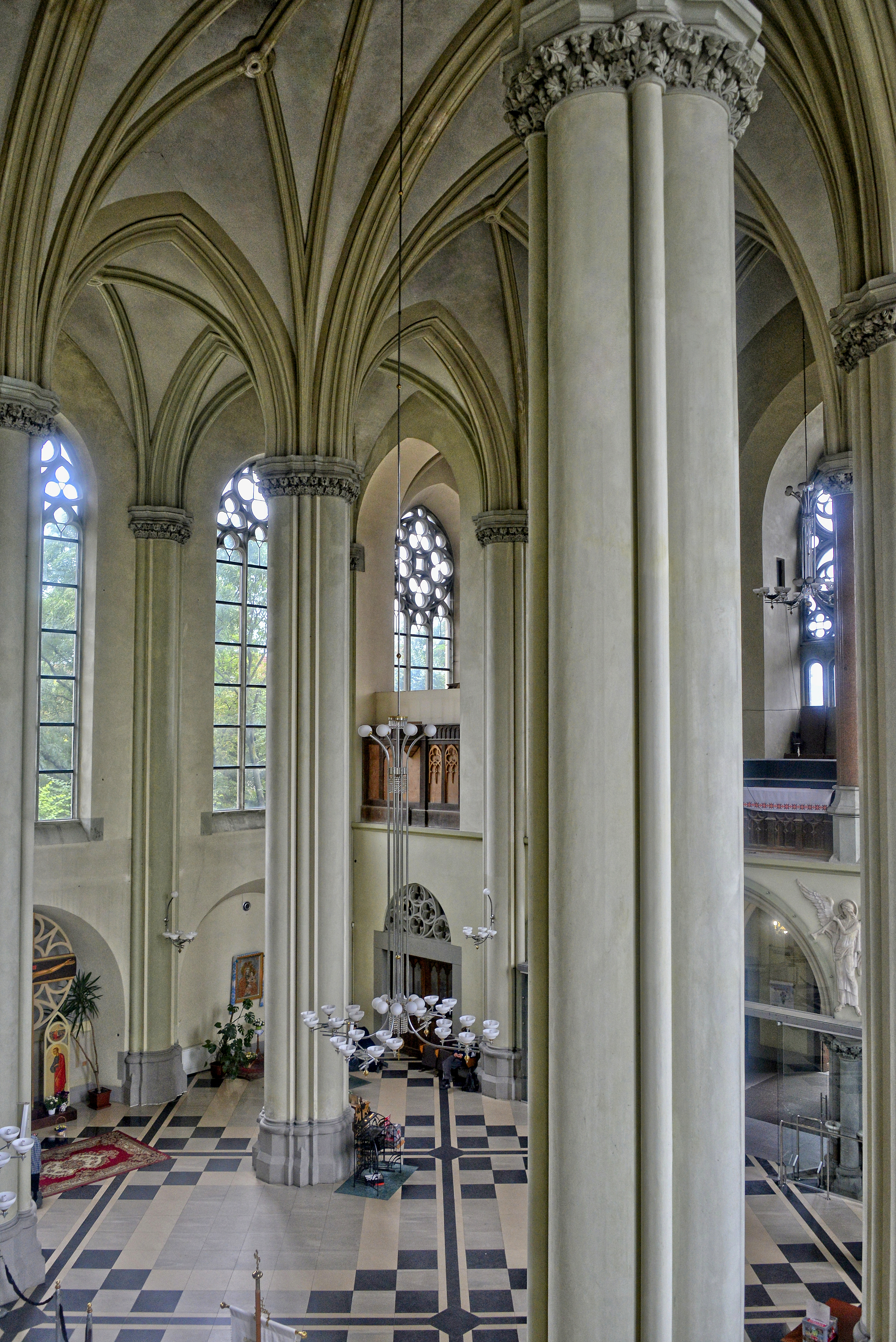

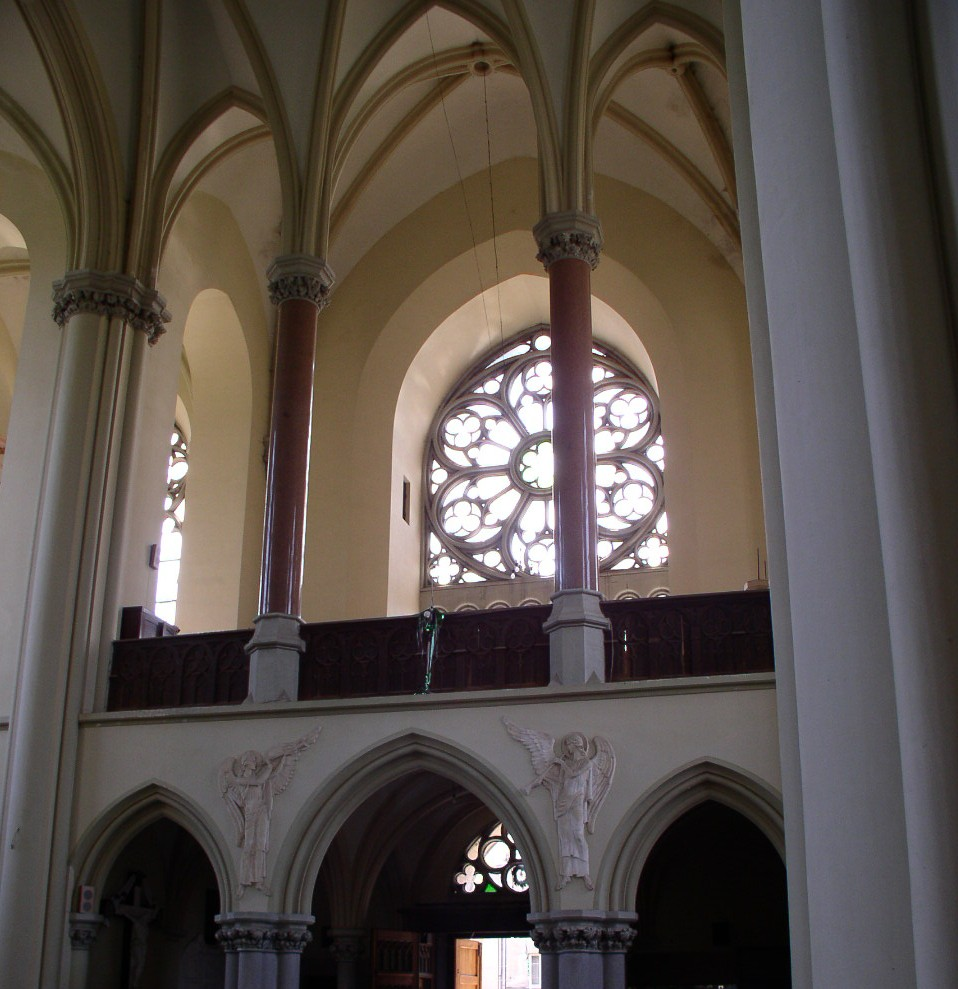

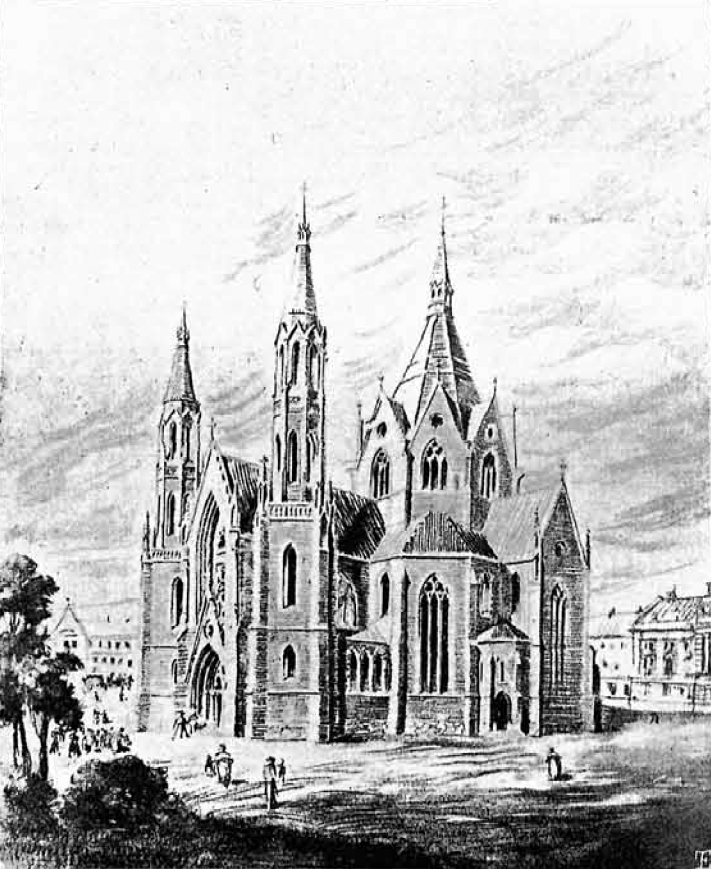
