= Teodor Talowski =

Polish architect (1857–1910)

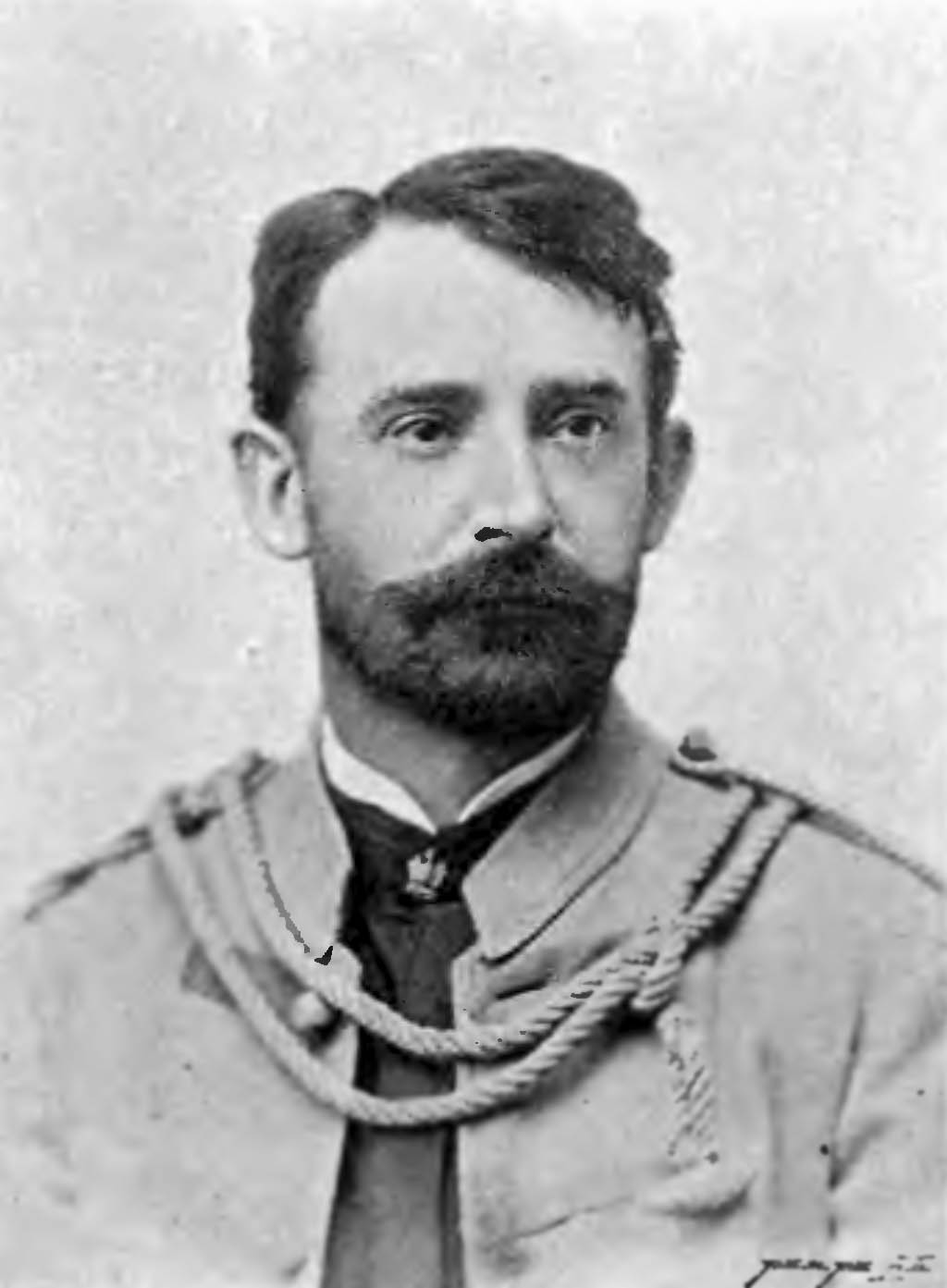
- Born: 23 March 1857; Zasów, Galicia, Austria-Hungary (now Poland)
- Died: 1 May 1910 (aged 53); Lviv, Galicia, Austria-Hungary (now Ukraine)
- Occupation: Architect
- Practice: Lviv Polytechnic
- Buildings: Church of St. Elizabeth, Lviv

Teodor Marian Talowski (born 23 March 1857 in Zasów; died 1 May 1910 in Lviv) was a Polish architect and painter. Because of his style, which combined late Historicism with Art Nouveau and Modernist influences, he has been described as "the Polish Gaudi". His works include apartment buildings, churches, chapels and public buildings in Kraków, Lviv and other cities throughout former Austrian Galicia.

== Biography ==
Talowski was born in Zassów (now Zasów) near Tarnów, in Austrian Galicia, and attended a gymnasium in Kraków. Later he moved to Vienna, where he studied architecture under Karl König. After two years he moved to Lviv, to study under Julian Zachariewicz at Lviv Polytechnic, from which he graduated in 1881. He came back to Kraków to be a professor at the Higher School of Technology and Industry (Polish: Wyższa Szkoła Techniczo-Przemysłowa). In 1901 he was appointed the chair of the Department of Drawing and later the Department of Medieval Architecture Composition at Lviv Polytechnic.

Throughout his whole professional life, Talowski worked mainly in Galicia, designing public utility buildings as well as private houses. The works of Talowski are set in eclecticism, showing strong connections with historicism and Art Nouveau.

He died prematurely in 1910 in Lviv after five years of poor health and was interred at the Rakowicki Cemetery in Kraków.

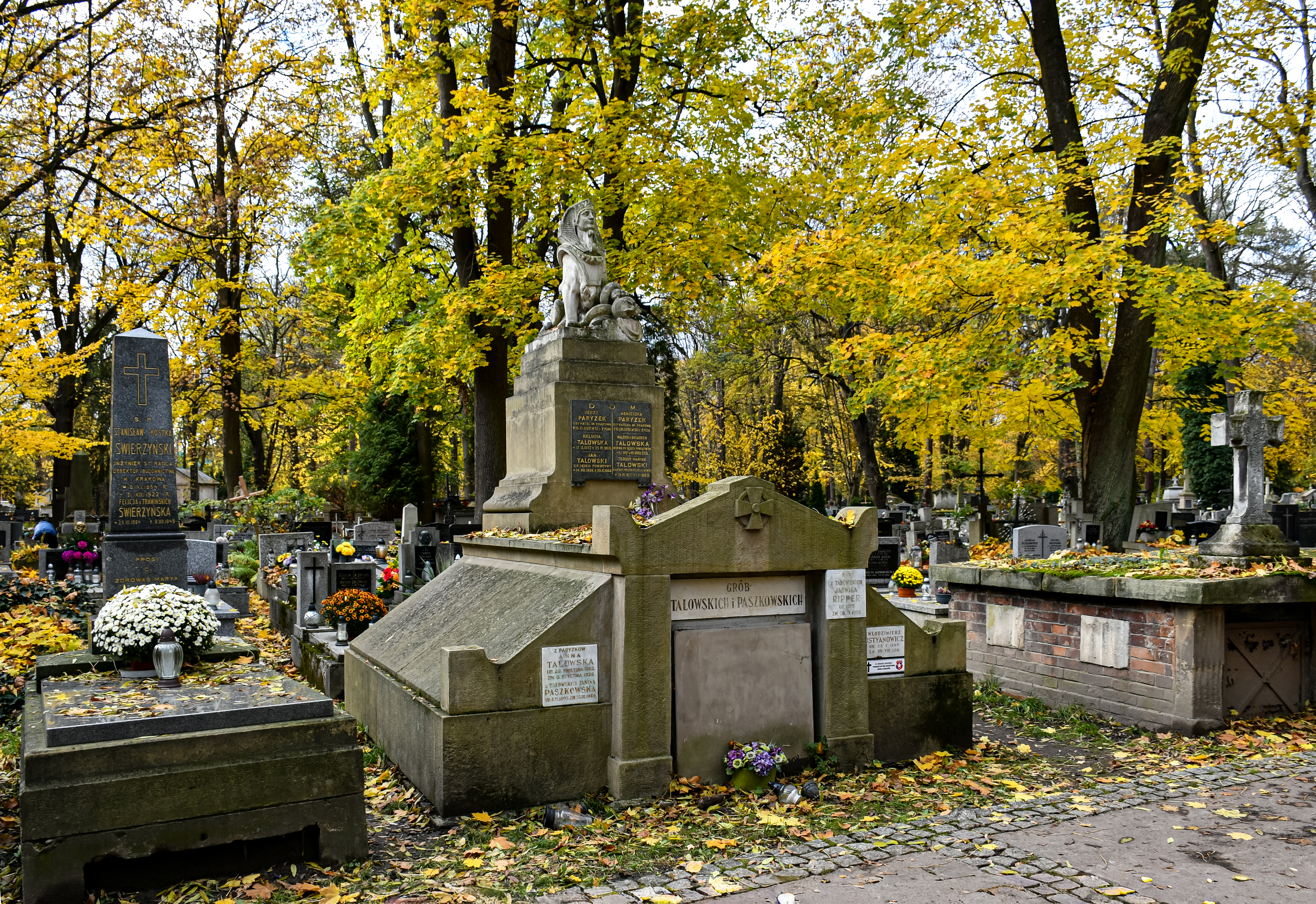
Tomb of Teodor Talowski Rakowicki Cemetery, 26 Rakowicka Street, Kraków

== Main works ==
=== Residential buildings ===
- Complex of tenement houses in Kraków at 1,3,7,9,15 Retoryka street:

• 1 Retoryka Street - Under the Singing Frog (Pol. Pod śpiewającą żabą), 1889–90
• 7 Retoryka Street - Festina Lente (Latin Hasten slowly), 1887
• 9 Retoryka Street - Under the Donkey (Pod Osłem), 1891
• 15 Retoryka Street - Think Long, Act Fast (Długo myśl, prędko czyń), 1888

- Talowski's own house Under the Spider (Pol. Pod pająkiem) on Karmelicka Street, Kraków, 1889
- Tenement house at 18 Smoleńsk Street, Kraków, Under the Dragon (Pod Smokiem), 1887

=== Churches ===
Talowski designed over 70 churches, including:

- Church of St. Elizabeth in Lviv, Ukraine (1903–11)
- St. Mary of the Perpetual Assistance Church in Ternopil, Ukraine (1903–08)
- St. Elizabeth Church in Nowy Sącz
- St. Casimir Church in Nowy Sącz
- St. Nicholas Church in Przyszowa
- Parochial Church in Sucha Beskidzka
- Jesus' Transfiguration Church in Libiąż
- St. Stanisław Church in Osobnica
- Assumption of St. Mary Church in Kamianka-Buzka
- St. Anne Church in Wadowice Górne
- All Saints' Church in Chorzelów
- Church of St. Anthony of Padua in Nagoszyn
- Church of St. Stanislaw the Bishop in Łańcut, (alteration)
- Sacred Heart of Jesus Church in Bóbrka
- St. Sophia and St. Stephen Church in Laszki
- St. Anne Church in Skalat, Ukraine
- Sacred Heart of Jesus Church, Stoyaniv, Ukraine
- The Polish church in Cacica, Romania

=== Other works ===
- Lubicz Street Viaduct in Kraków
- Brothers Hospitallers of St. John of God Hospital in Kraków
- Dąbrowski Manor in Michałowice
- Kraków electric works building
- Żeleński's palace in Grodkowice near Kraków
- Talowski's family tomb at the Rakowicki Cemetery
- Dobiecki Manor House in Cianowice

== Gallery ==
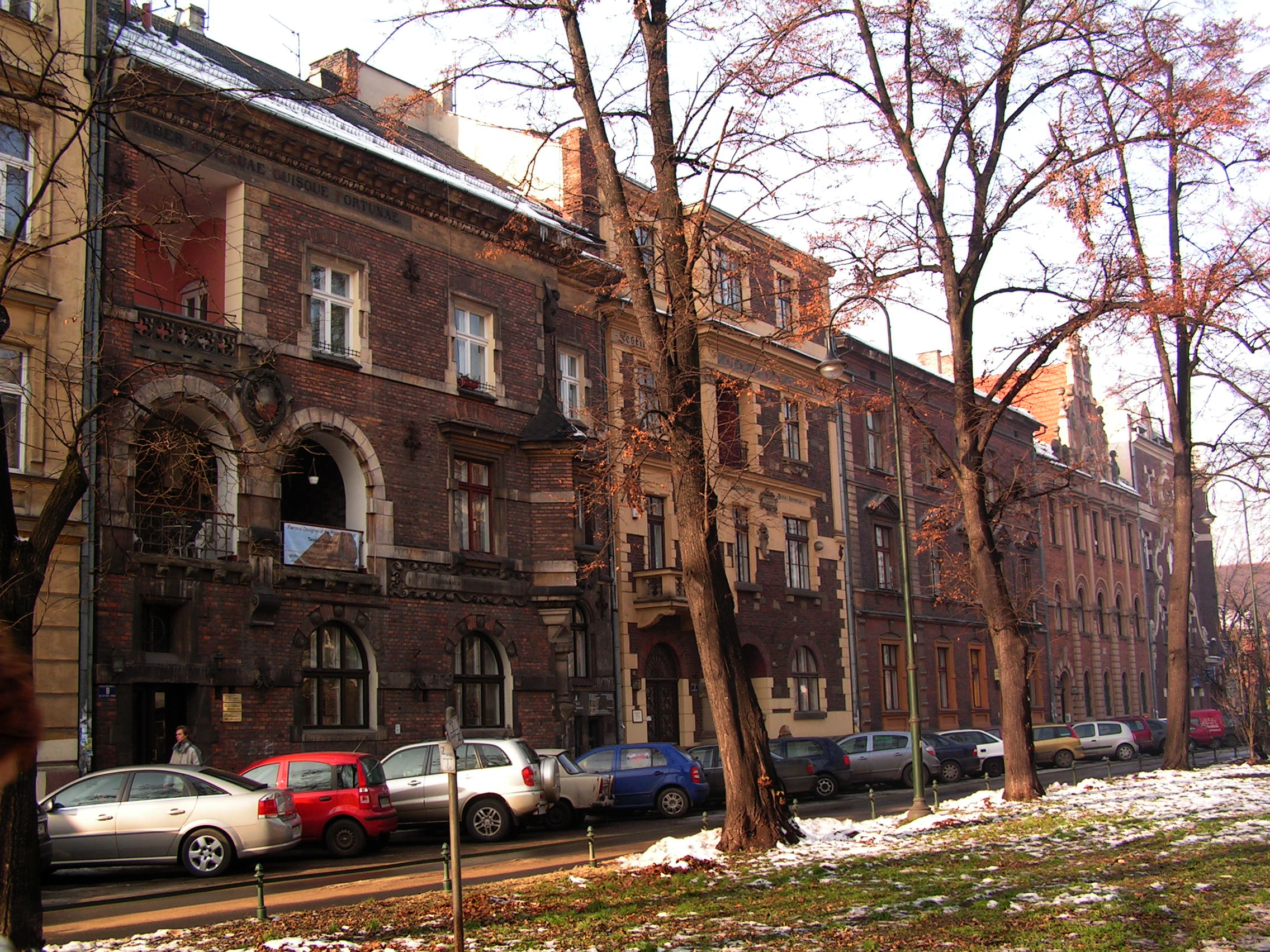
Some of Talowski's houses at Retoryka street, Kraków. From the left - numbers 9th-1st

Dobiecki Manor House, Cianowice

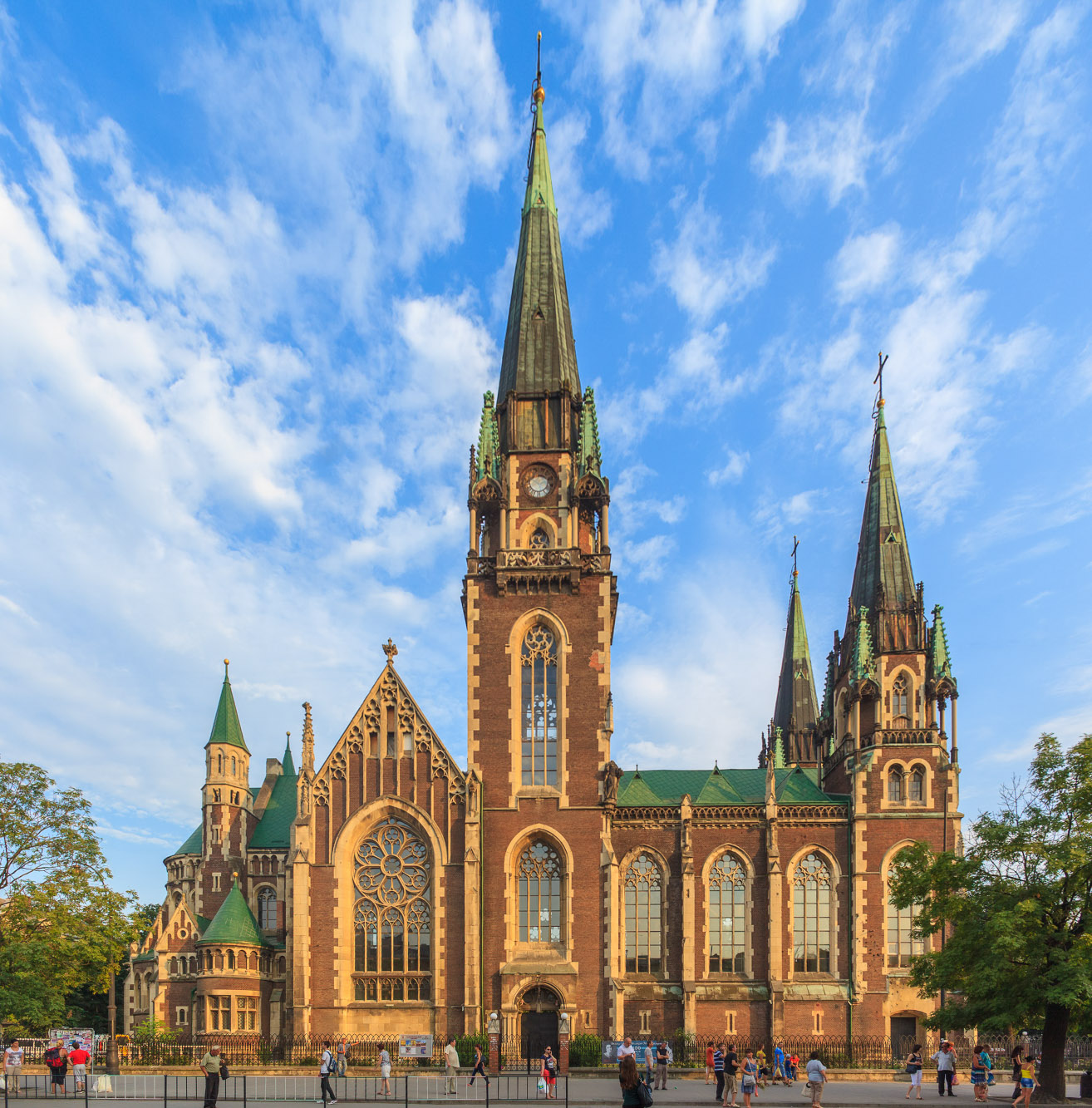
St. Elisabeth's Church in Lviv, the northern elevation

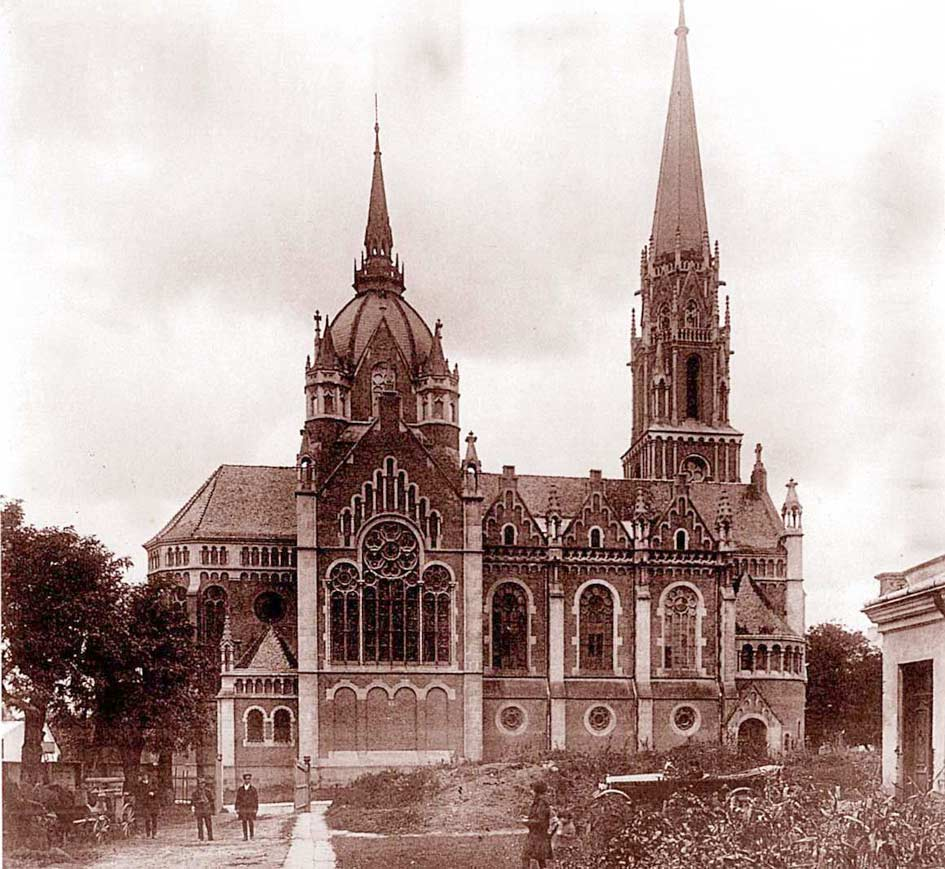
Church of St. Mary of the Perpetual Assistance in Ternopil built between 1903–08, demolished by the Soviets in 1954

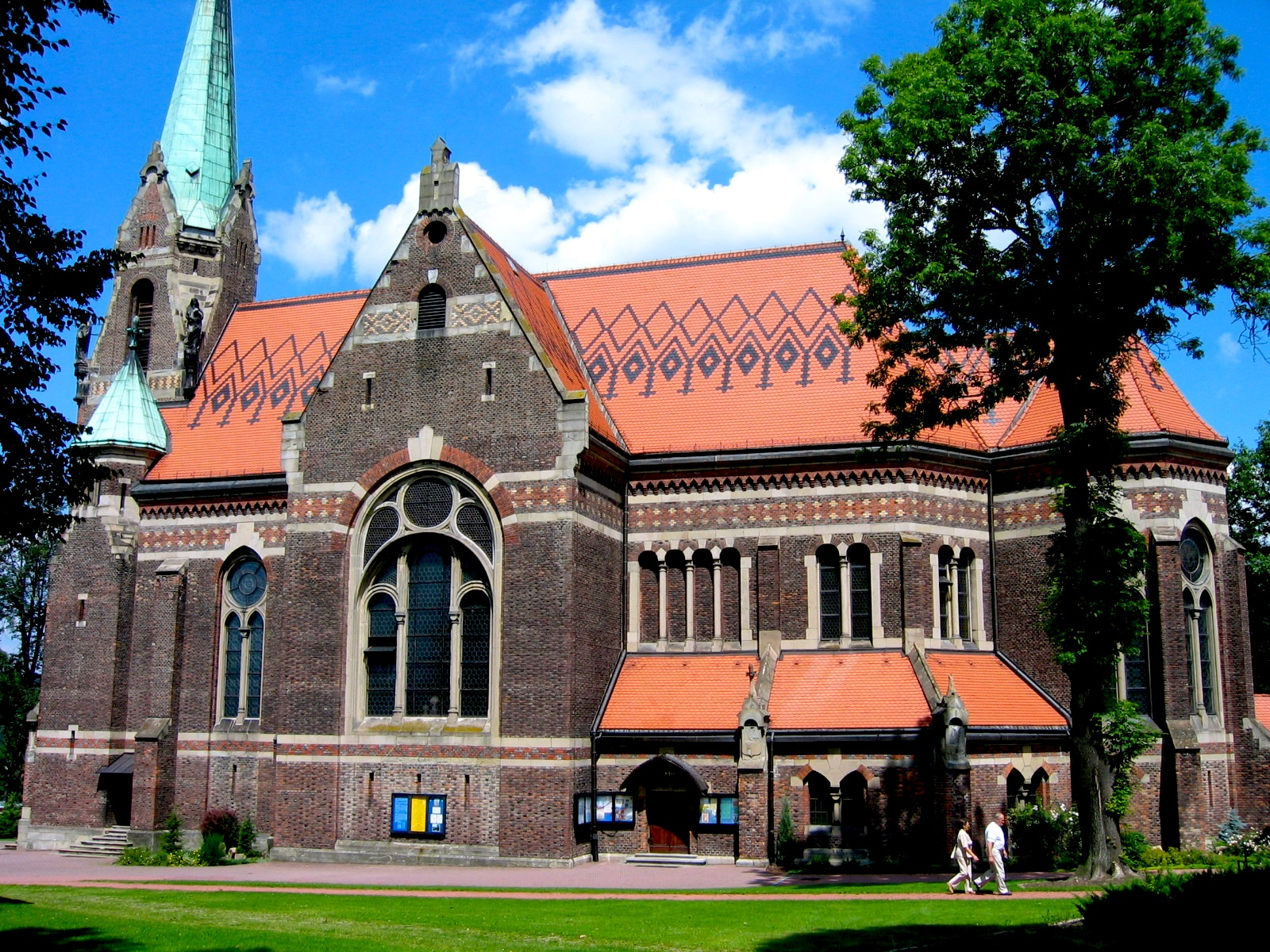
Parish Church in Sucha Beskidzka

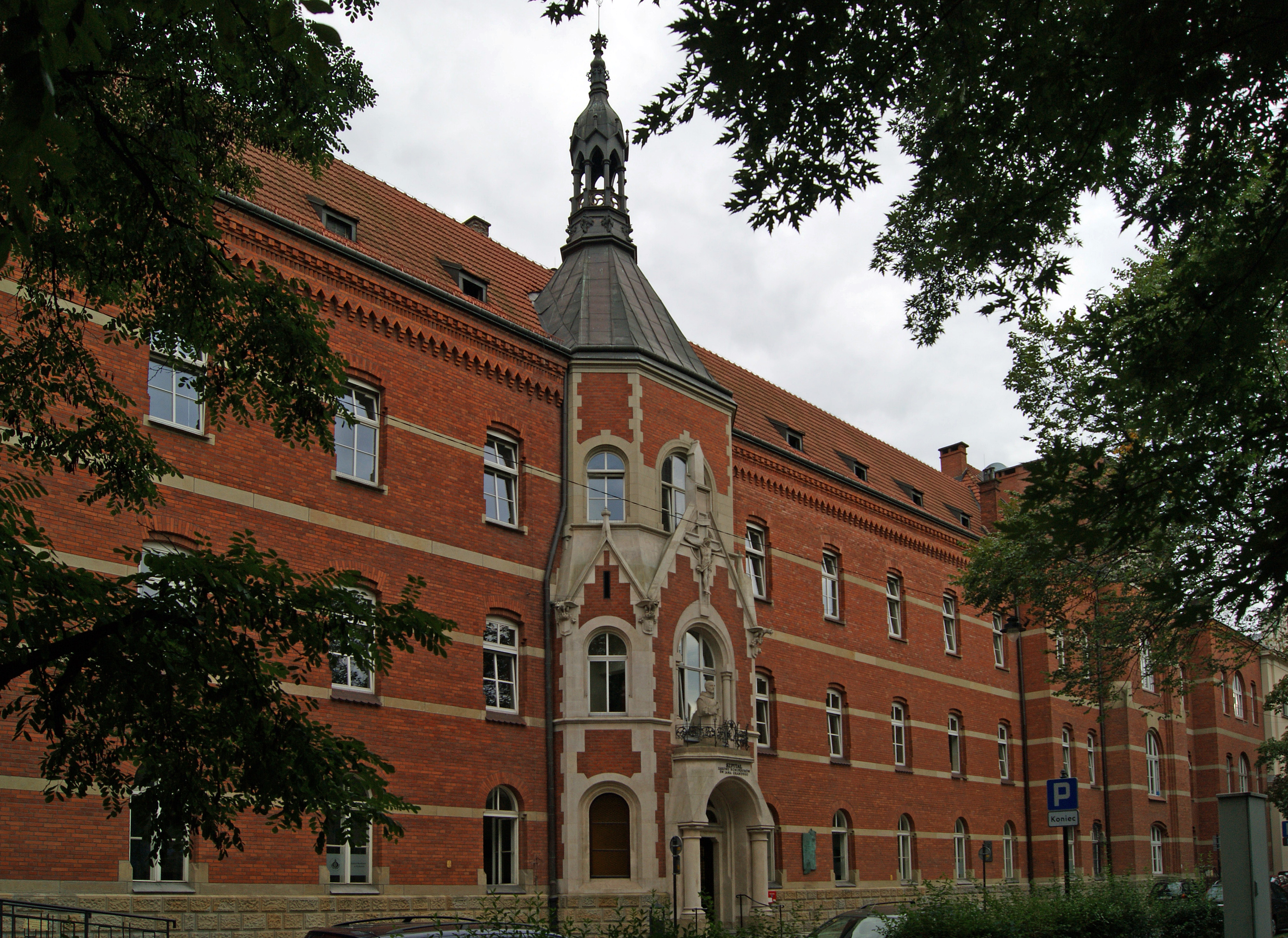
St.John of God Hospital, Kraków

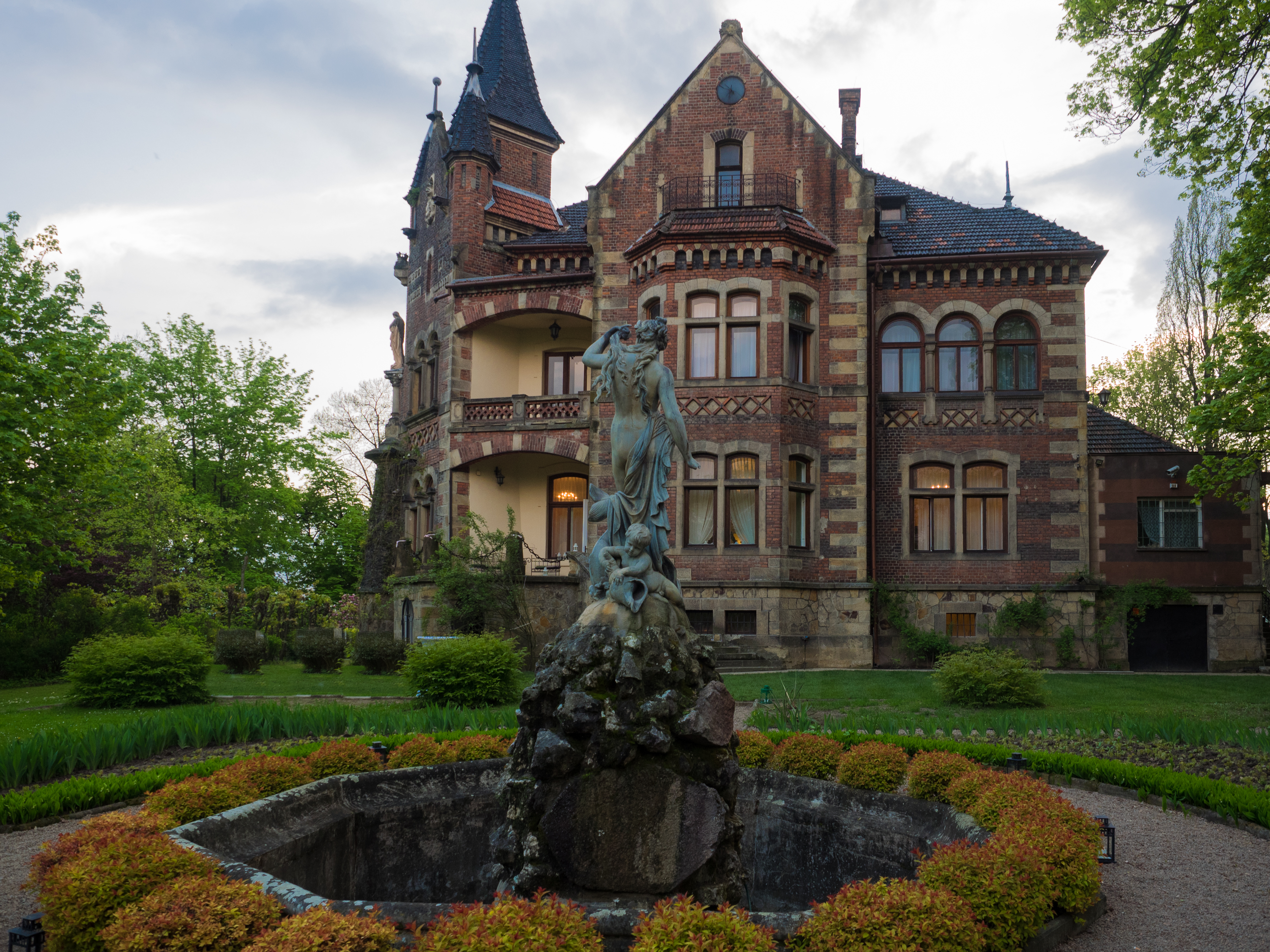
Manor house of the Żeleński family in Grodkowice

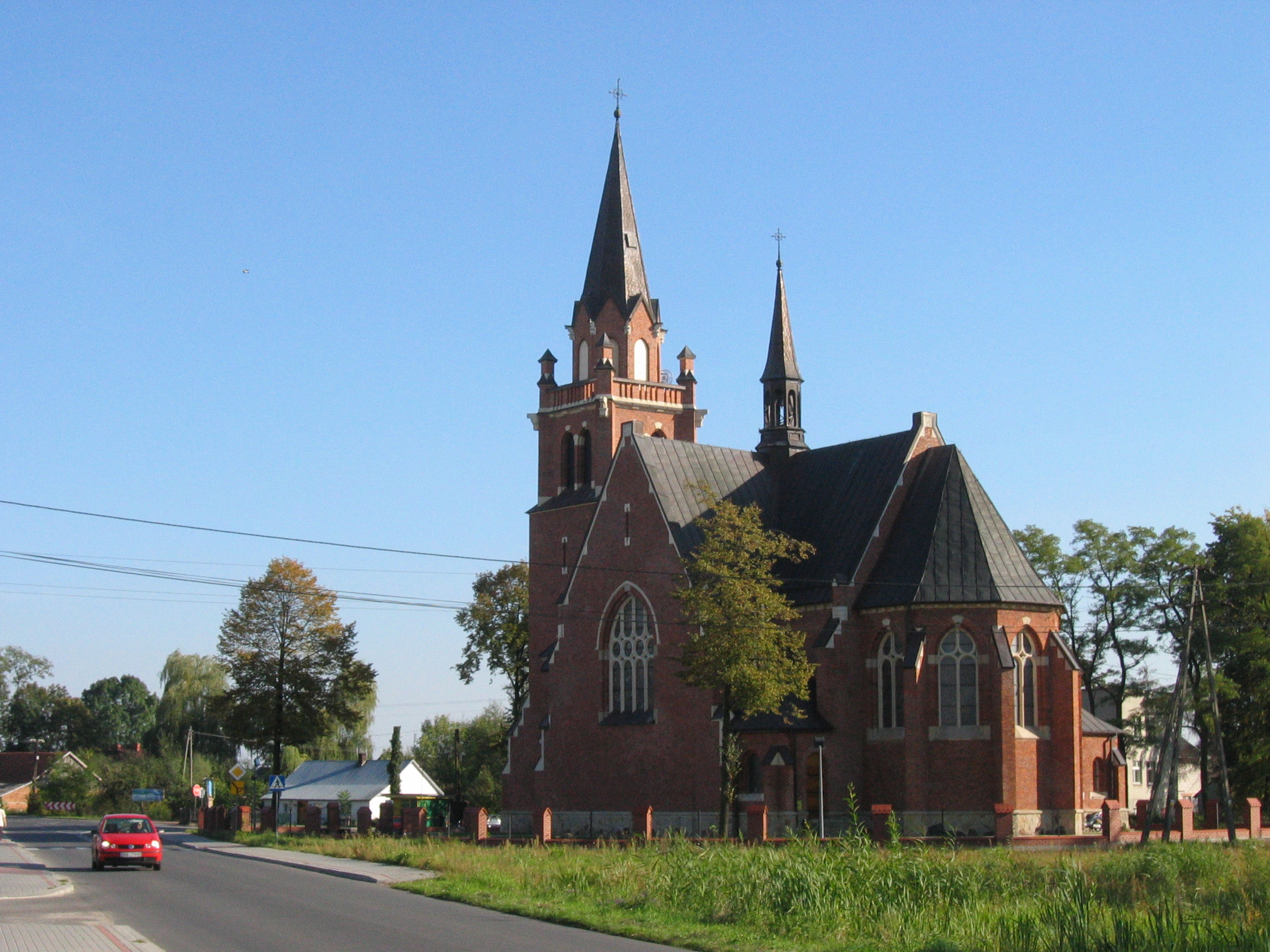
St. Anne Church in Wadowice Górne

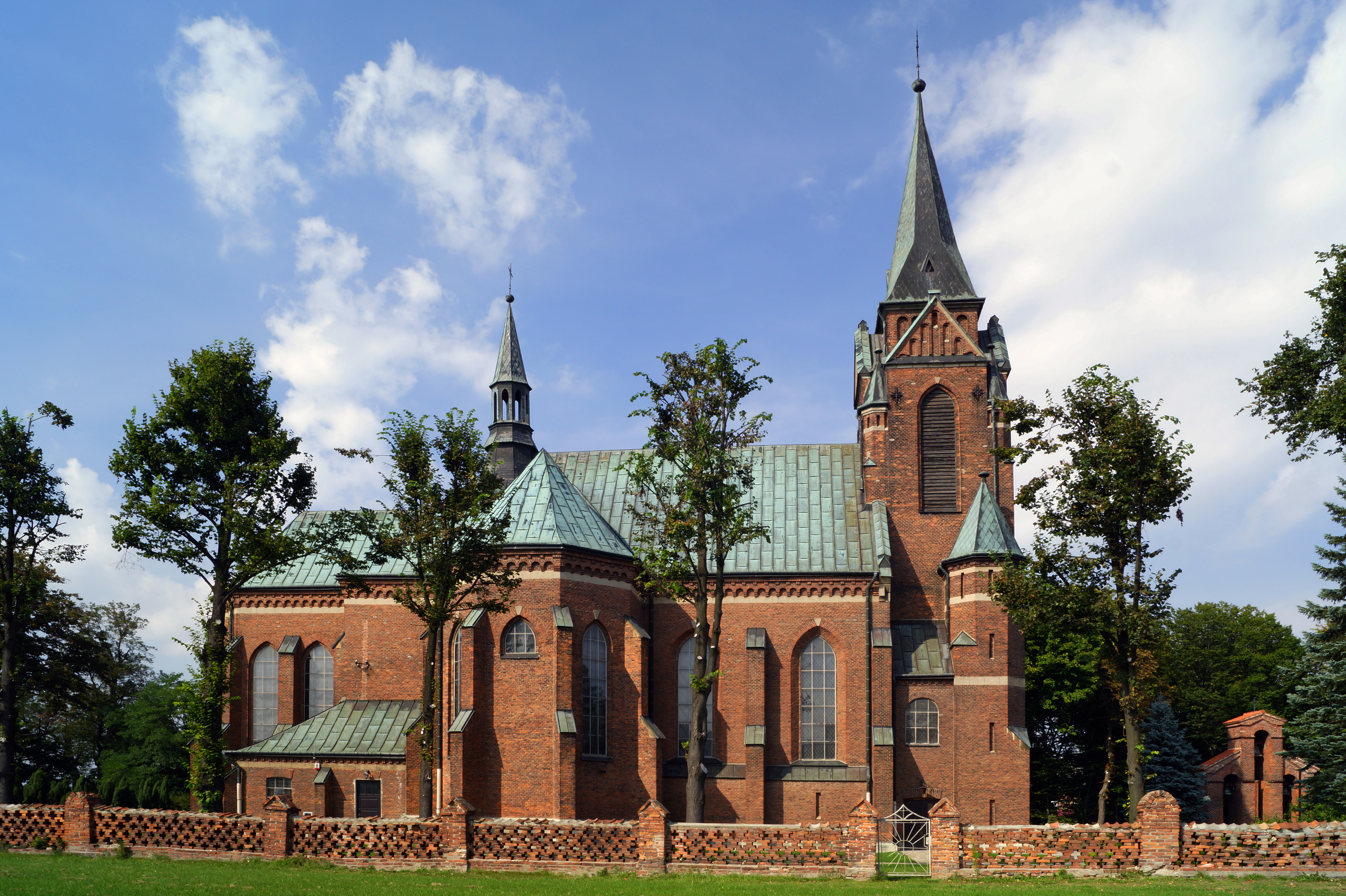
St. Nicholas Church in Lubzina

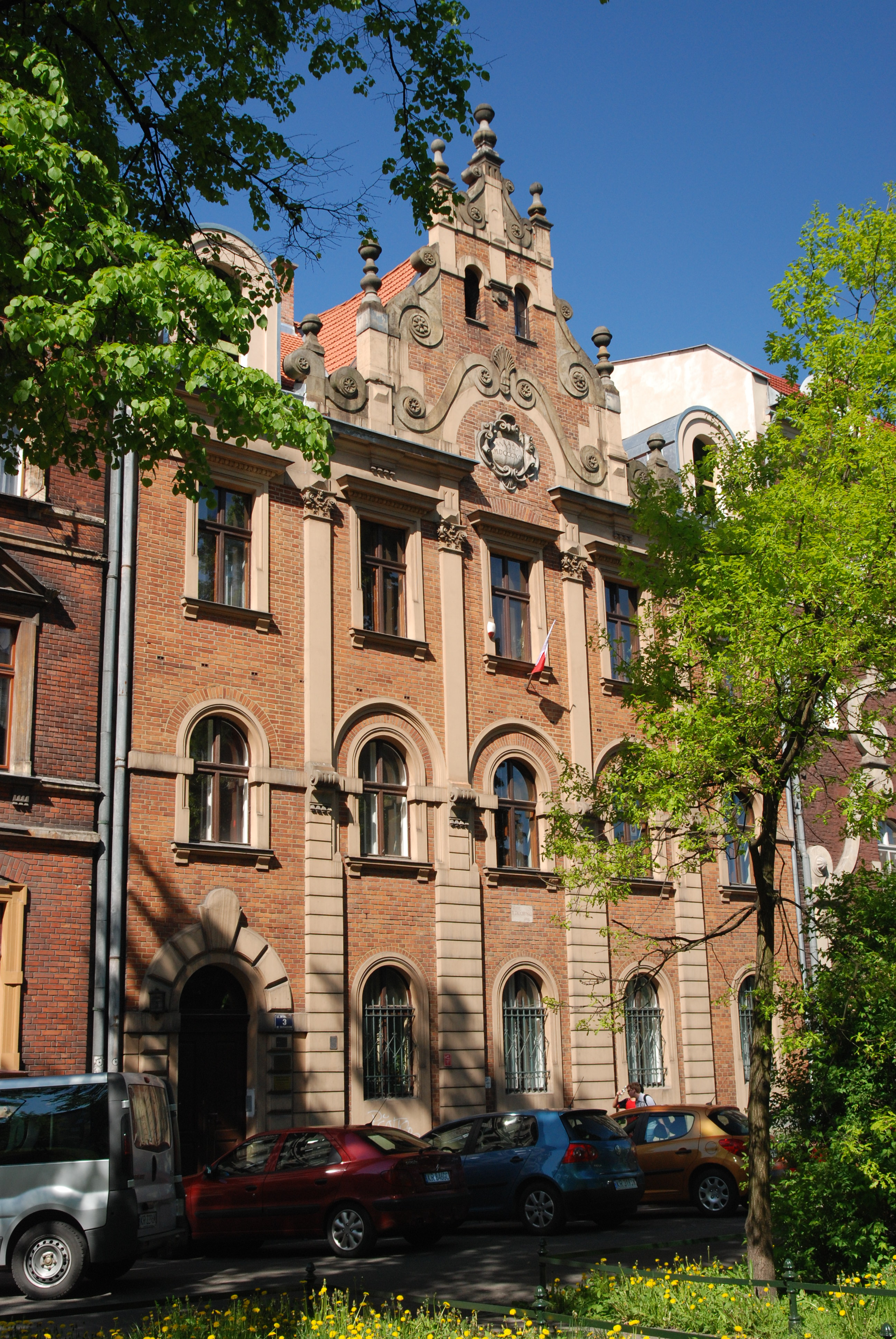
A townhouse on Retoryka Street, Kraków

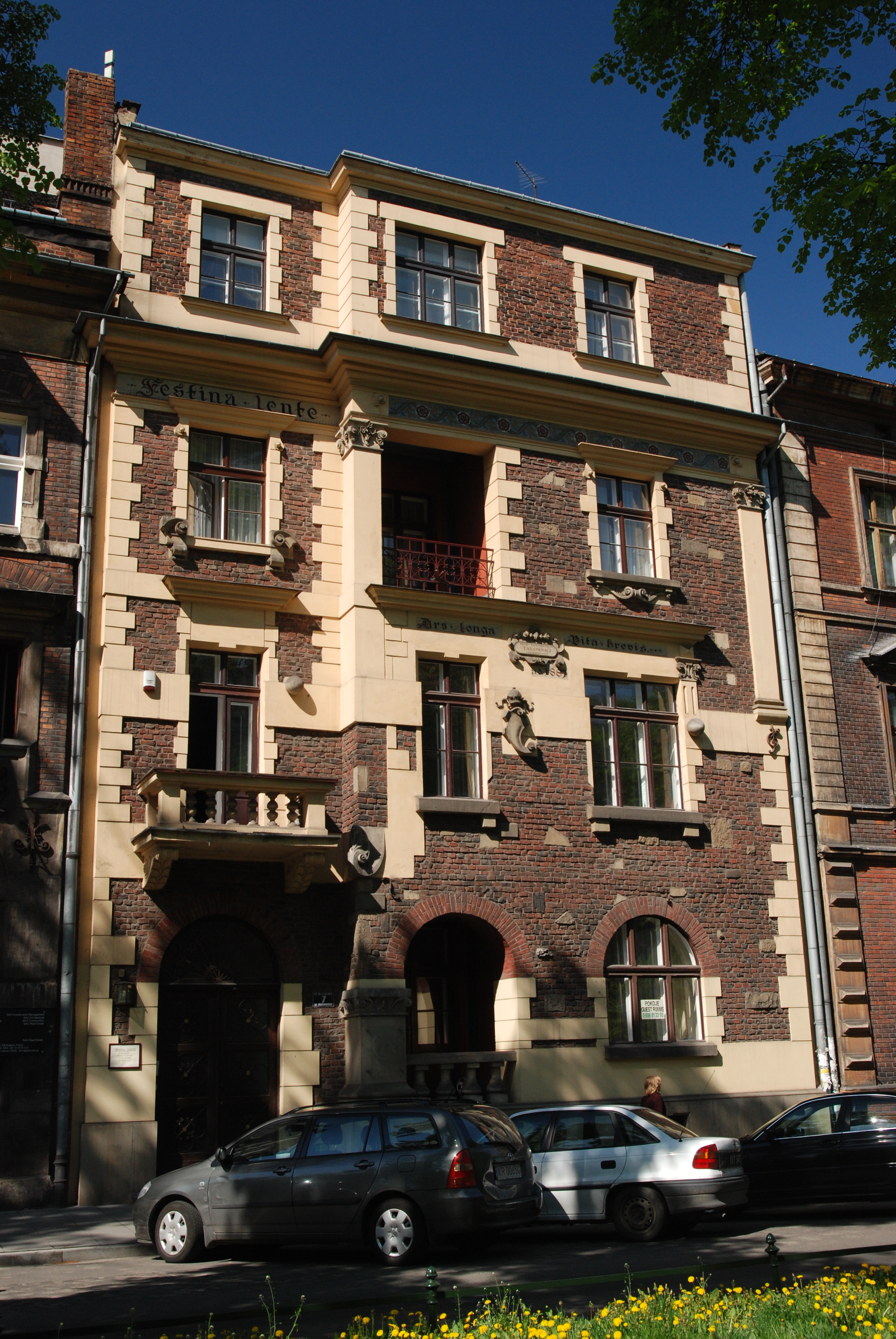
Festina lente Townhouse, Kraków

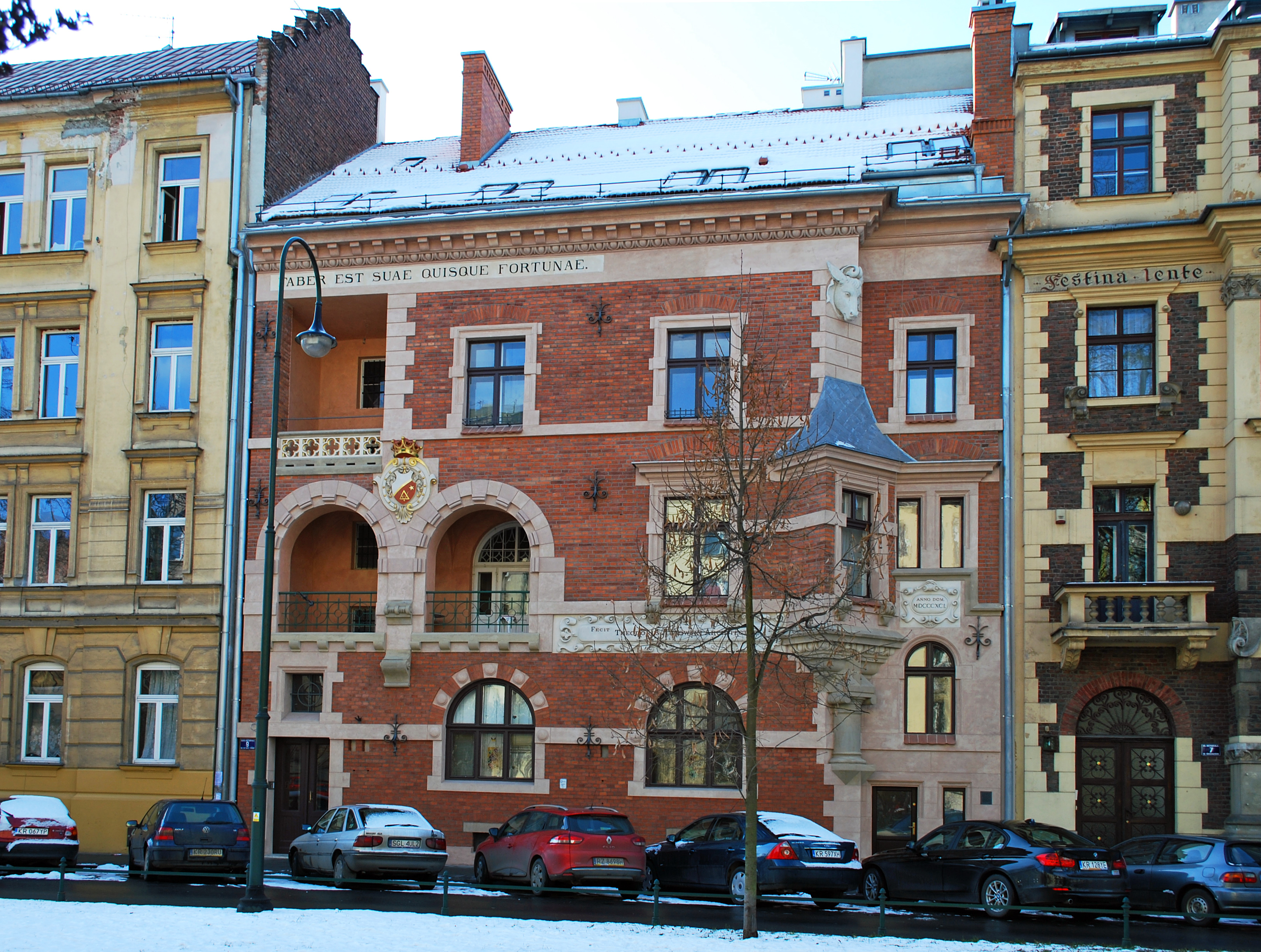
The Pod Osłem Townhouse, Kraków

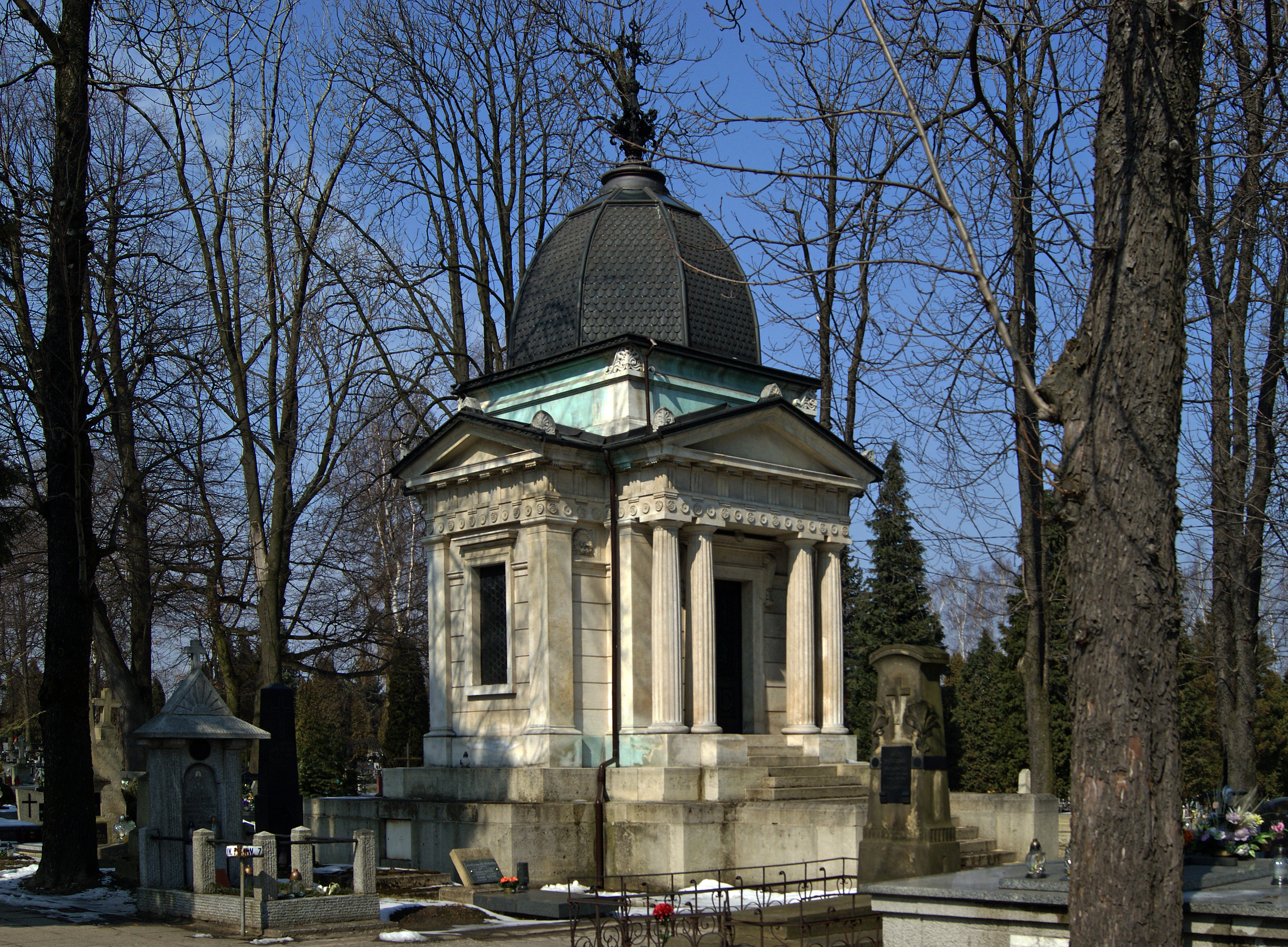
The Loewenfeld Mausoleum, Chrzanów

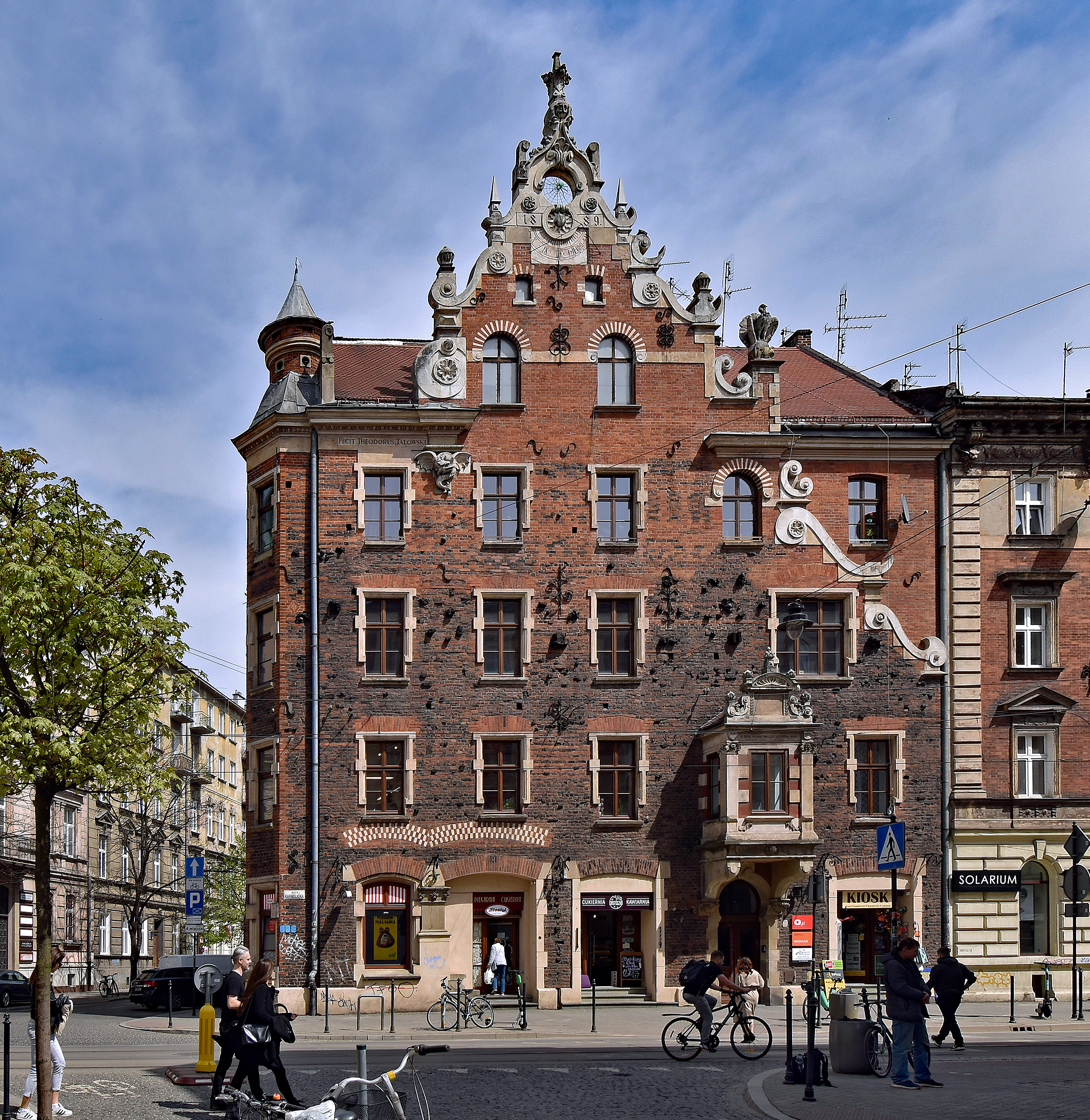
Under the Spider Tenement House, Kraków

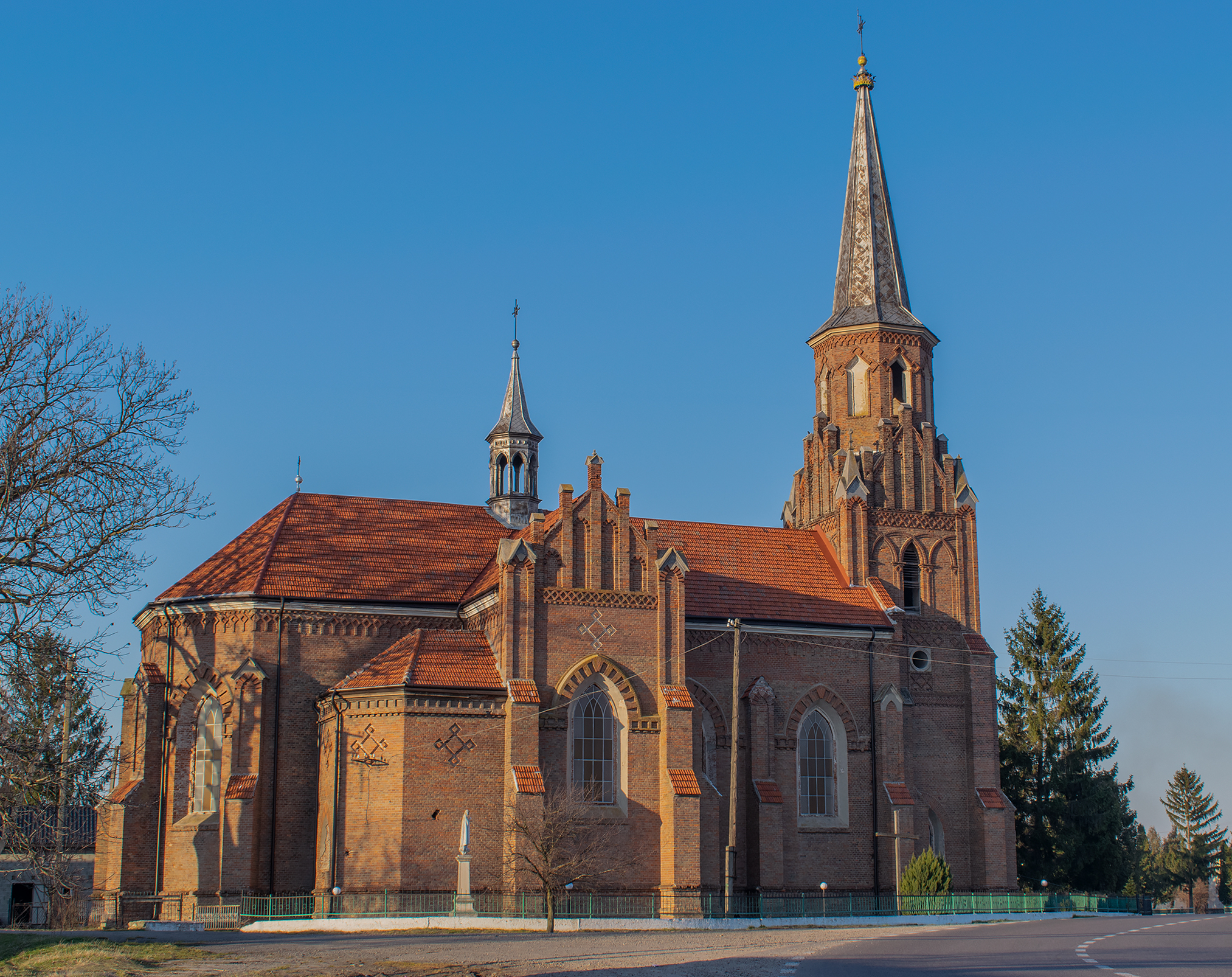
Sacred Heart of Jesus Church, Stoyaniv

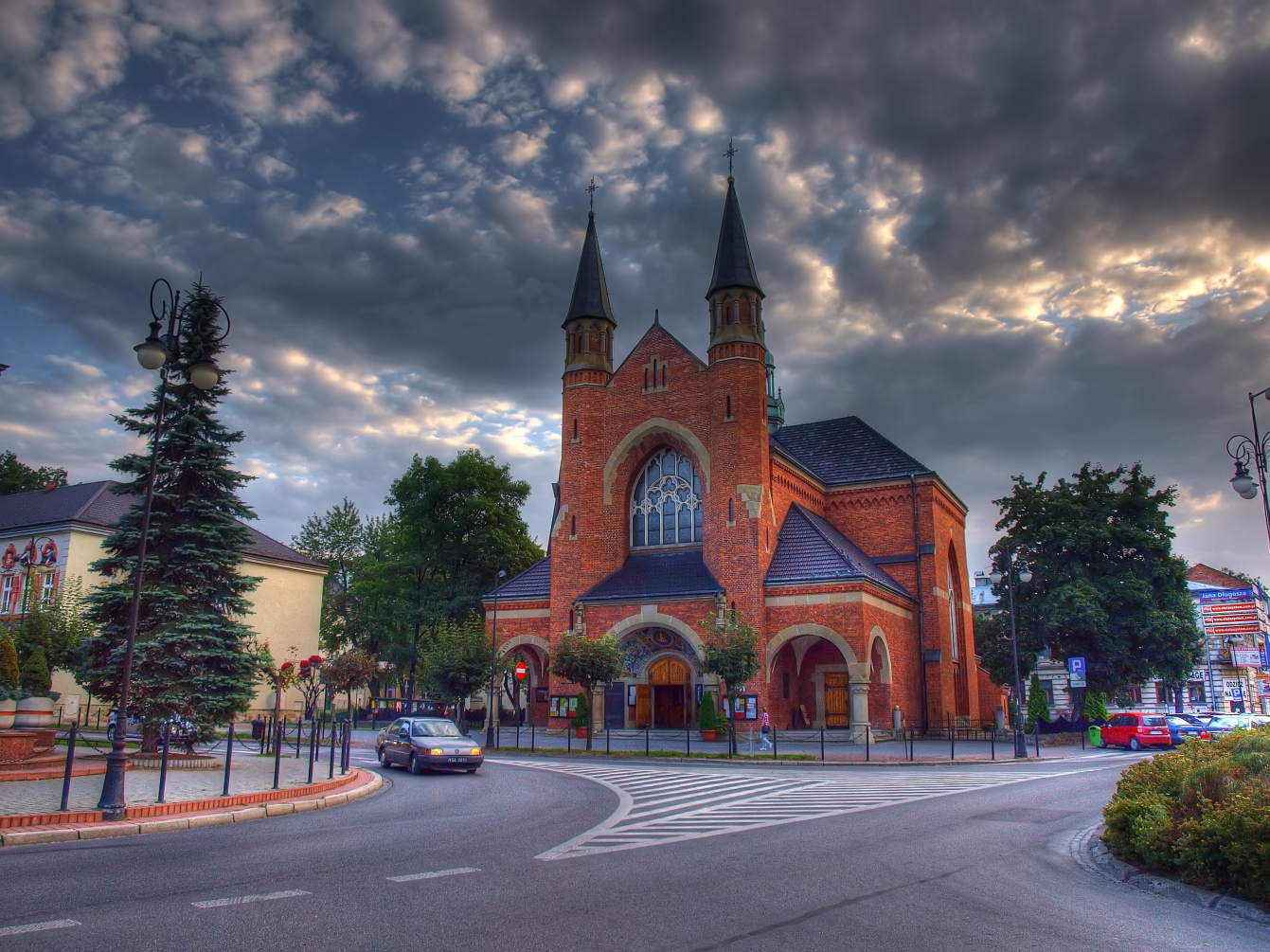
St. Casimir's Church, Nowy Sącz

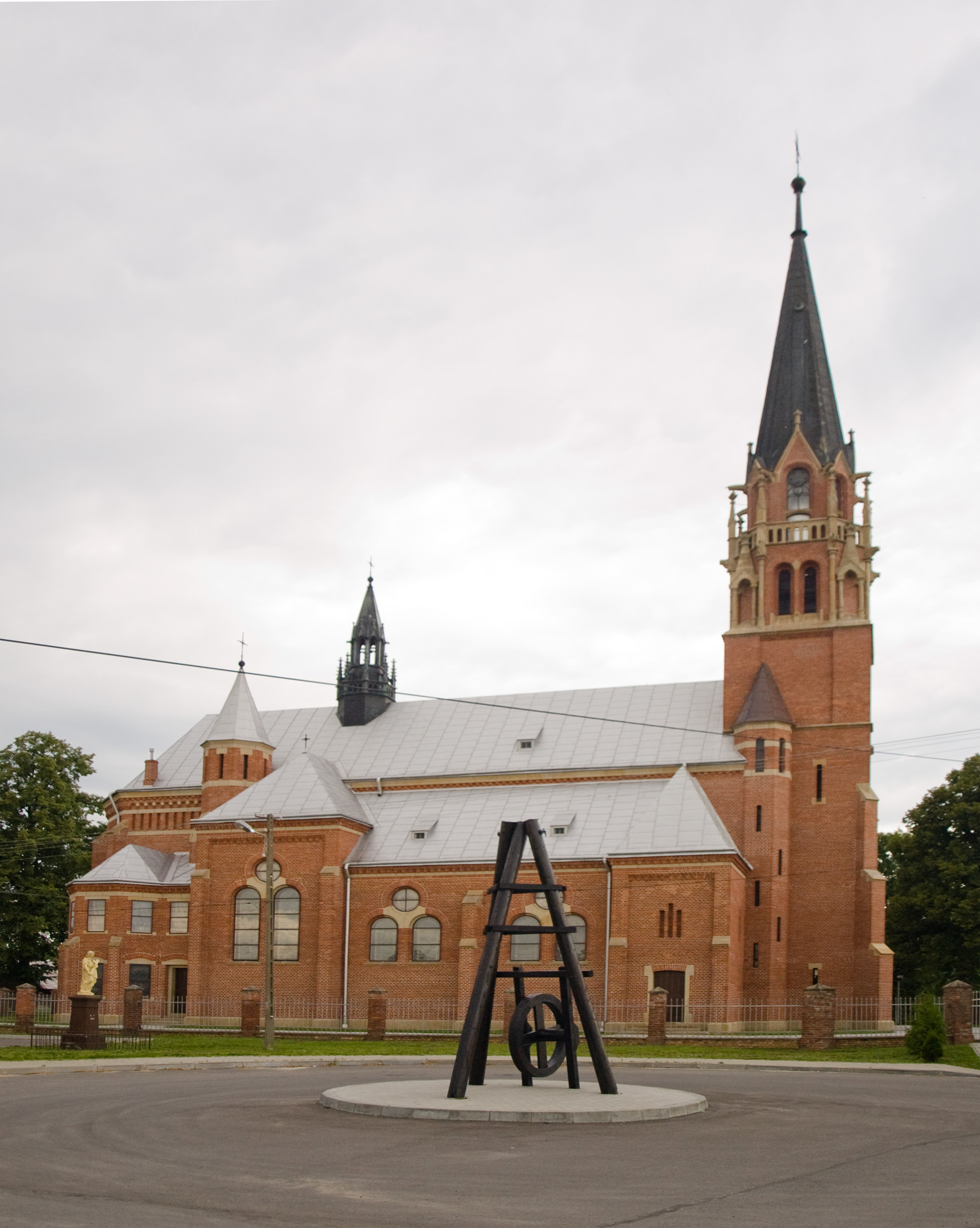
Sacred Heart of Jesus Church, Bóbrka

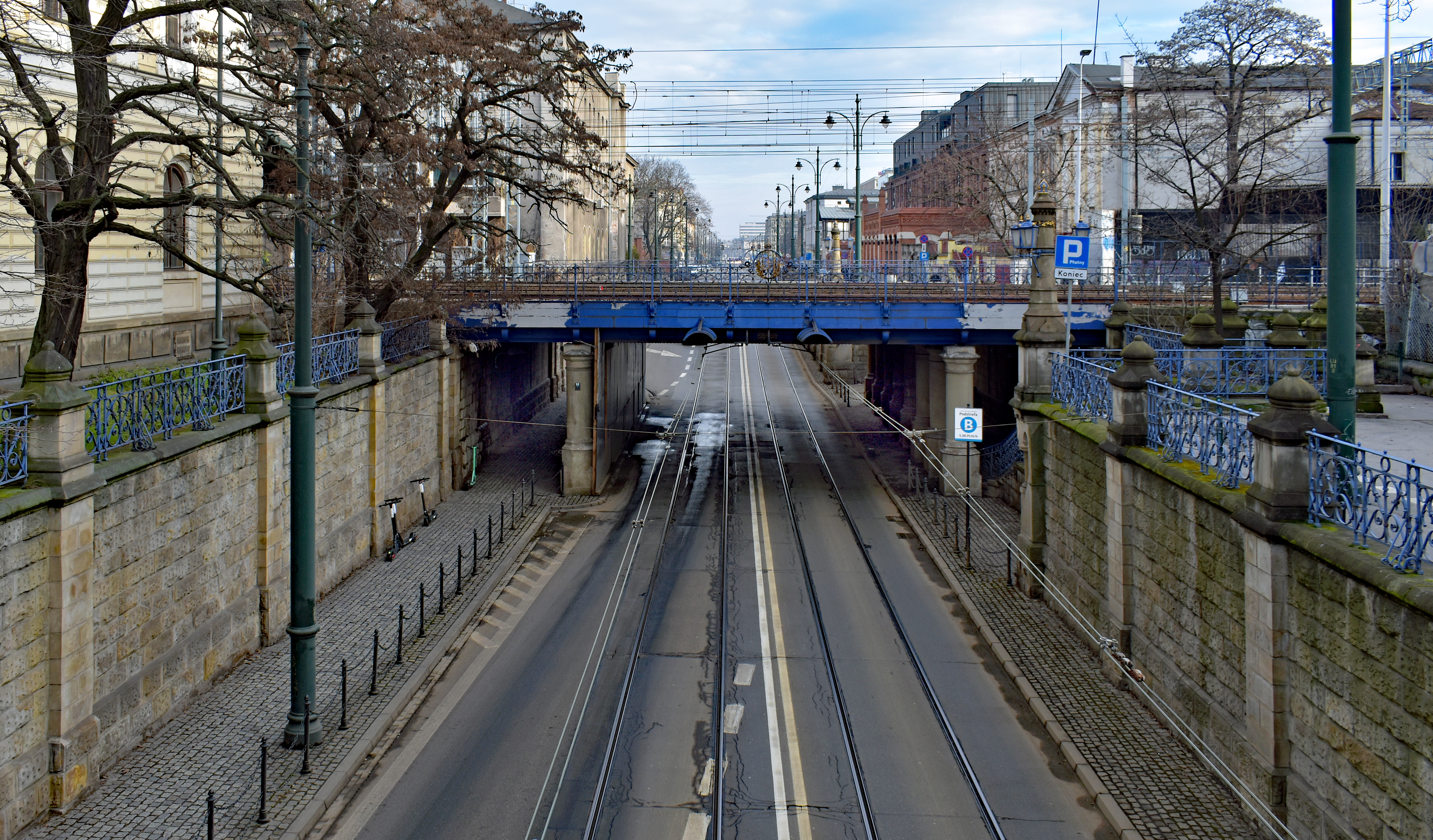
Railway viaduct, Lubicz Street, Kraków

== See also ==
- History of Lviv
- Julian Zachariewicz

== Sources ==
• Maciej Gutowski, Bartłomiej Gutowski, Architektura Secesyjna w Galicji, DiG publishing, Warsaw 2001, p. 23-27 (in Polish).
