= Giebułtów =

Giebułtów may refer to the following places in Poland:

- Giebułtów, Lower Silesian Voivodeship (south-west Poland)
- Giebułtów, Kraków County in Lesser Poland Voivodeship (south Poland)
- Giebułtów, Miechów County in Lesser Poland Voivodeship (south Poland)
