= Wielka =

Wielka may refer to:

== Places in Poland ==
- Wielka Klonia
- Wielka Komorza
- Wielka Lipa
- Wielka Nieszawka
- Wielka Słońca
- Wielka Wieś
- Wielka Wola
- Wielka Łąka

== Other ==
- Wielka Krokiew, ski jump in Zakopane, Poland
