= Beblo =

Beblo may refer to:

- Bębło
- Fritz Beblo
