= Biały Kościół =

Biały Kościół may refer to the following places in Poland:

- Biały Kościół, Lower Silesian Voivodeship (south-west Poland)
- Biały Kościół, Lesser Poland Voivodeship (south Poland)
