= Rzędowice =

Rzędowice may refer to the following places:

- Rzędowice, Miechów County in Lesser Poland Voivodeship (south Poland)
- Rzędowice, Proszowice County in Lesser Poland Voivodeship (south Poland)
- Rzędowice, Opole Voivodeship (south-west Poland)
