= Archaeological Museum of Kraków =

Coordinates: 50.057738°N 19.936001°E

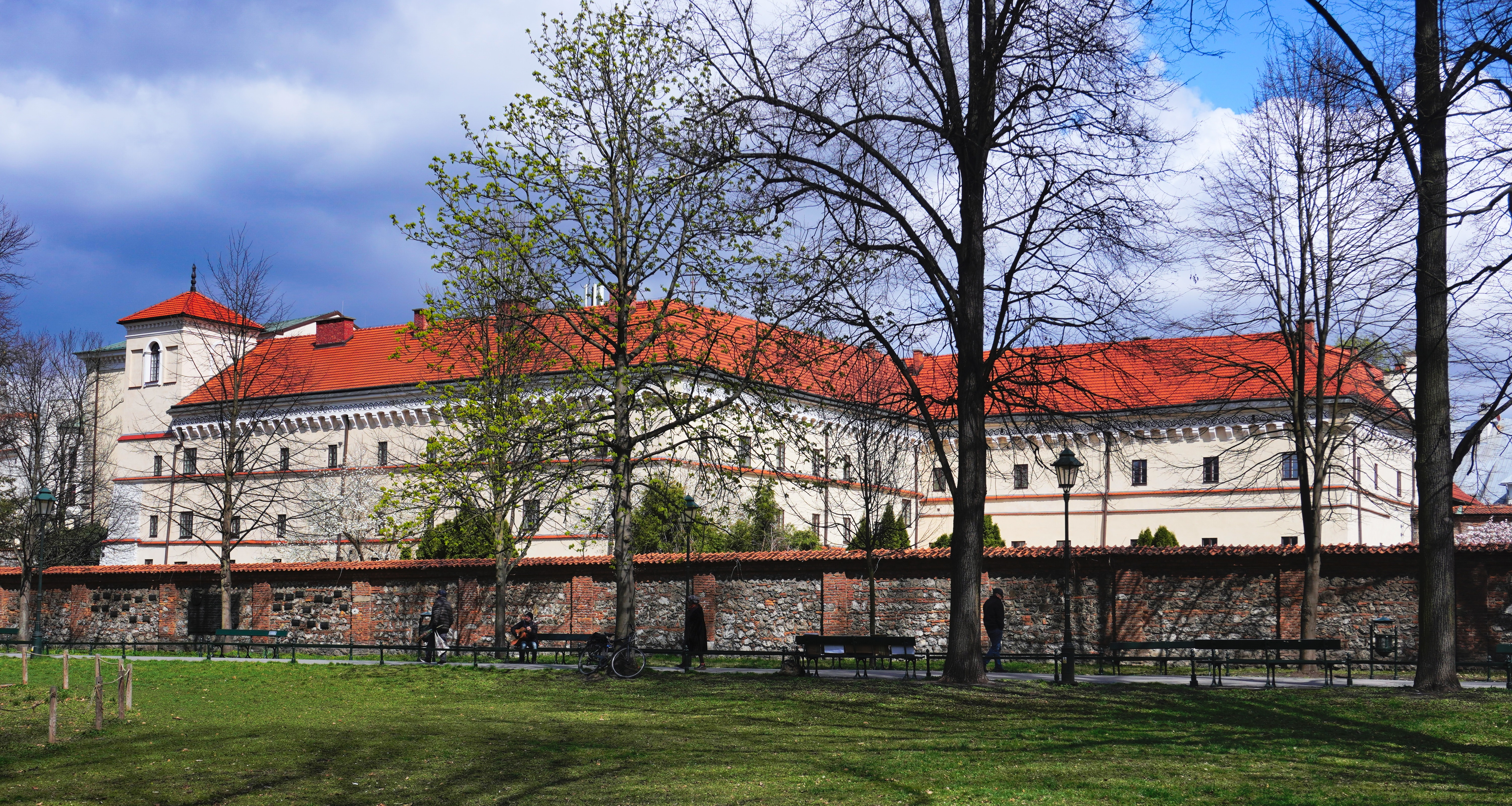
- Main building
- Established: 1850
- Location: Senacka str., Kraków, Poland
- Type: National museum
- Website: http://www.ma.krakow.pl/

The Archaeological Museum of Kraków (Polish: Muzeum Archeologiczne w Krakowie) is a historic museum in Kraków, Lesser Poland Voivodeship, Poland. It was established in 1850.

== History ==
The Archaeological Museum of Kraków is the oldest archaeology museum in Poland. It was founded as the Muzeum of Antiquity, by a group of intellectuals and academics who belonged to the Kraków Scientific Society (Towarzystwo Naukowe Krakowskie, TNK) during the Partitions of Poland. The foreign rule in the Austrian Partition prohibited the existence of Polish patriotic organizations except for the learning societies like the TNK; which in turn, set up a museum as centre of Polish socio-cultural activities. The TNK society which sponsored the museum foundation, existed in Kraków since 1816. It has formed its own Division of Art and Archeology in 1848.

The founding act was signed on 18 February 1850 by the Committee which included such notable personalities as Director of the Jagiellonian Library, Józef Muczkowski (President of the Committee), Karol Kremer (member of the Sejm of the Free City of Kraków: Rzeczypospolita Krakowska), Wincenty Pol (Professor UJ, poet and explorer), as well as Teofil Żebrawski (architect, city inspector). A series of documents including the museum mission statement were written for the administration, specifying the priority of the museum in obtaining archaeological finds from private donors. The first museum exhibit opened in 1857 at the Lubomirski Palace at 17 św. Jana Street. The collection originated mostly from private donations by numerous noble Polish families, including the statue of Zbruch Idol (Światowid ze Zbrucza), which is the symbol of the museum.

The museum is divided into five major permanent exhibitions: Gods of the Ancient Egypt, Prehistoric Pottery, The Garden of Ceramics, The Prehistory and Early Middle Ages of Lesser Poland, and The Carts of Bronocice, which includes the Bronocice Pot (3635–3370 BC) – a ceramic vase incised with the earliest known image of what may be a wheeled vehicle.

== Gallery ==
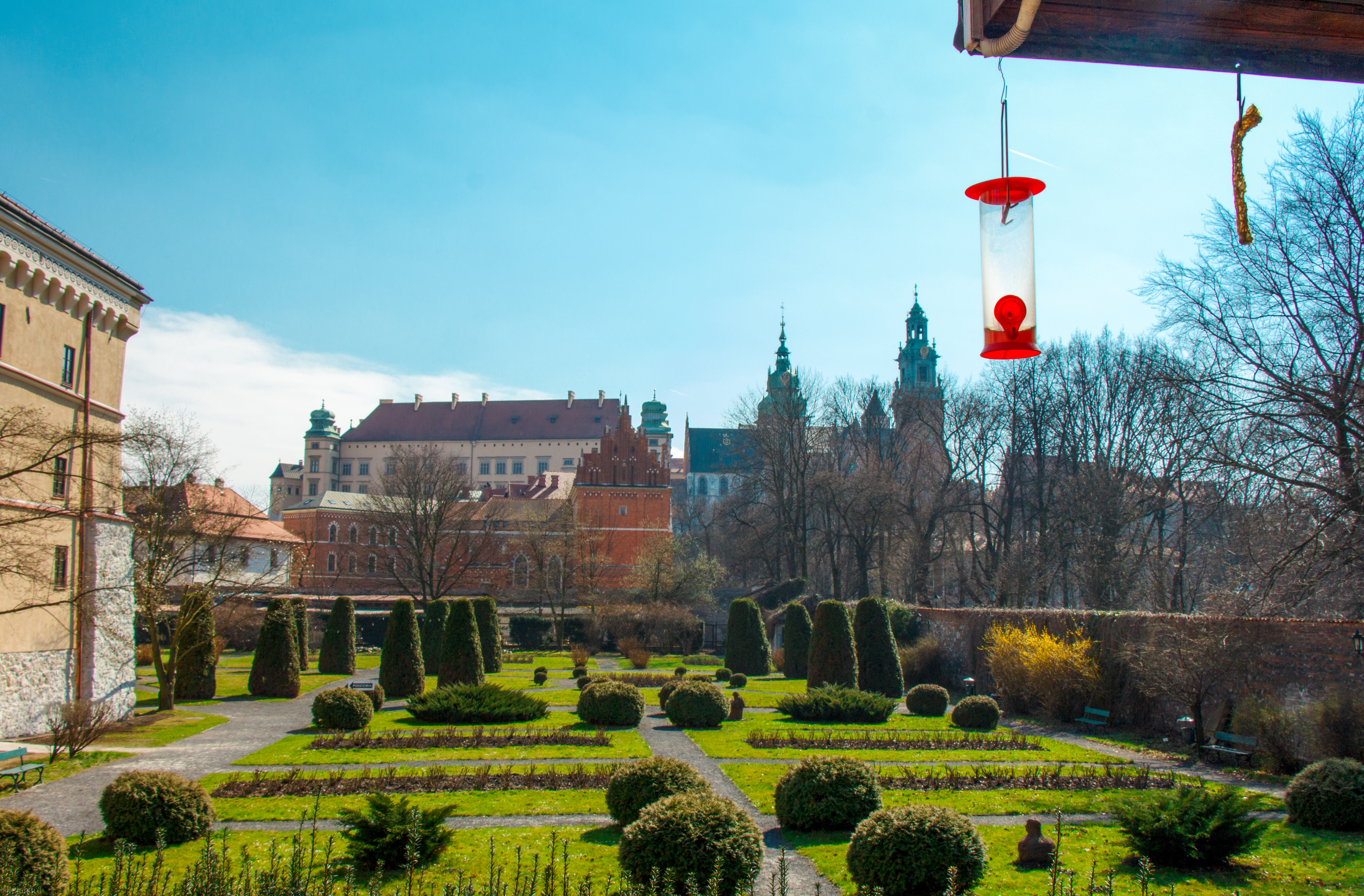
Museum Gardens with a view of the Wawel Hill

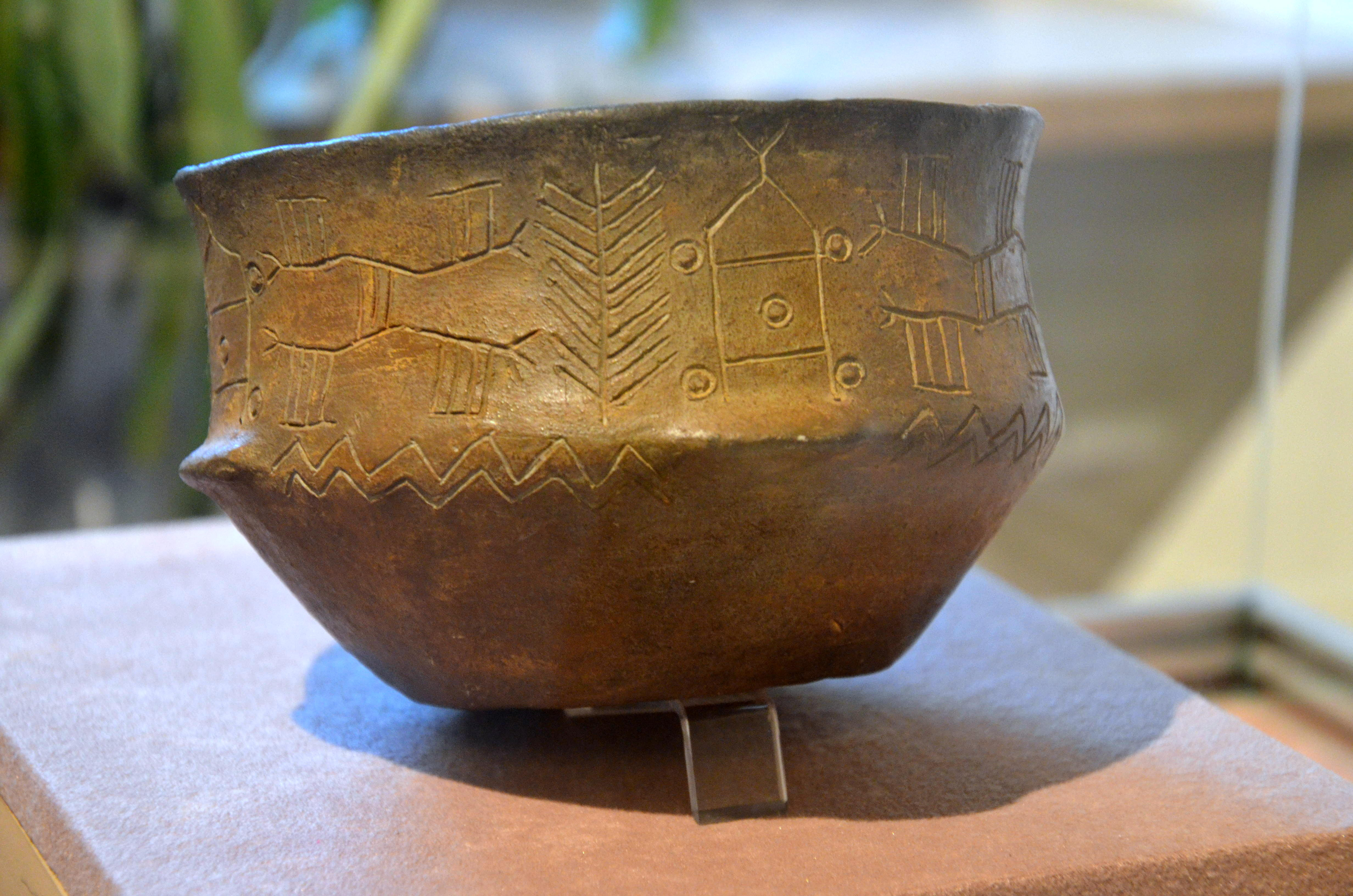
The Bronocice Pot, ca. 3,500 BCE

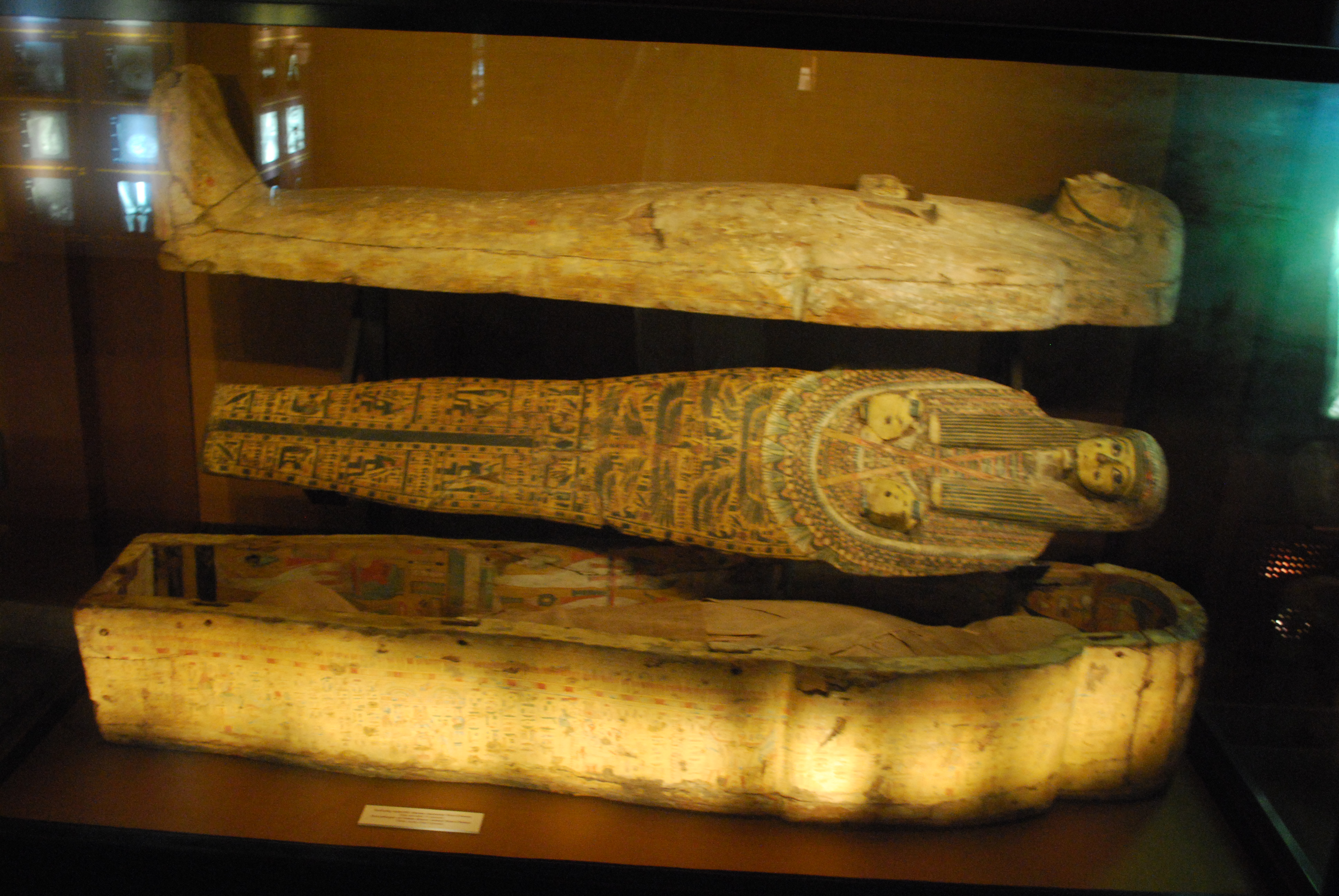
Egyptian mummy

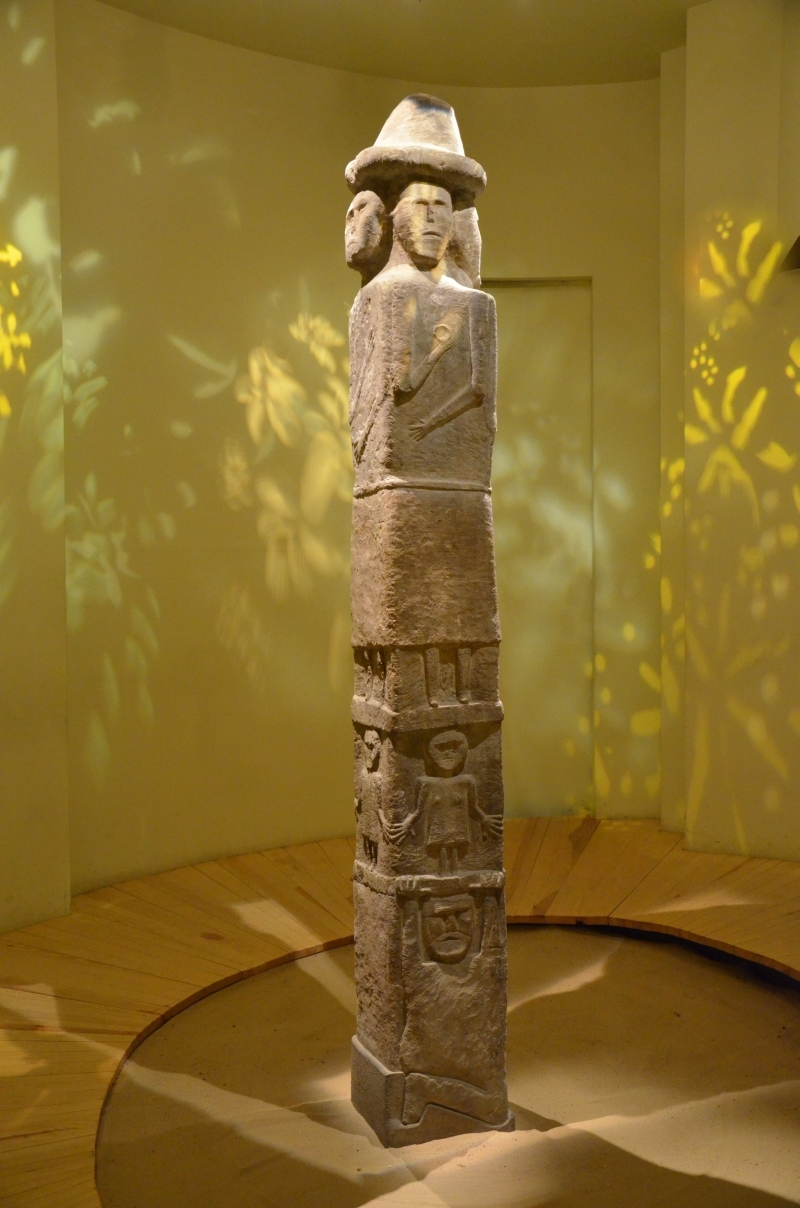
The Zbruch Idol, 9th century CE

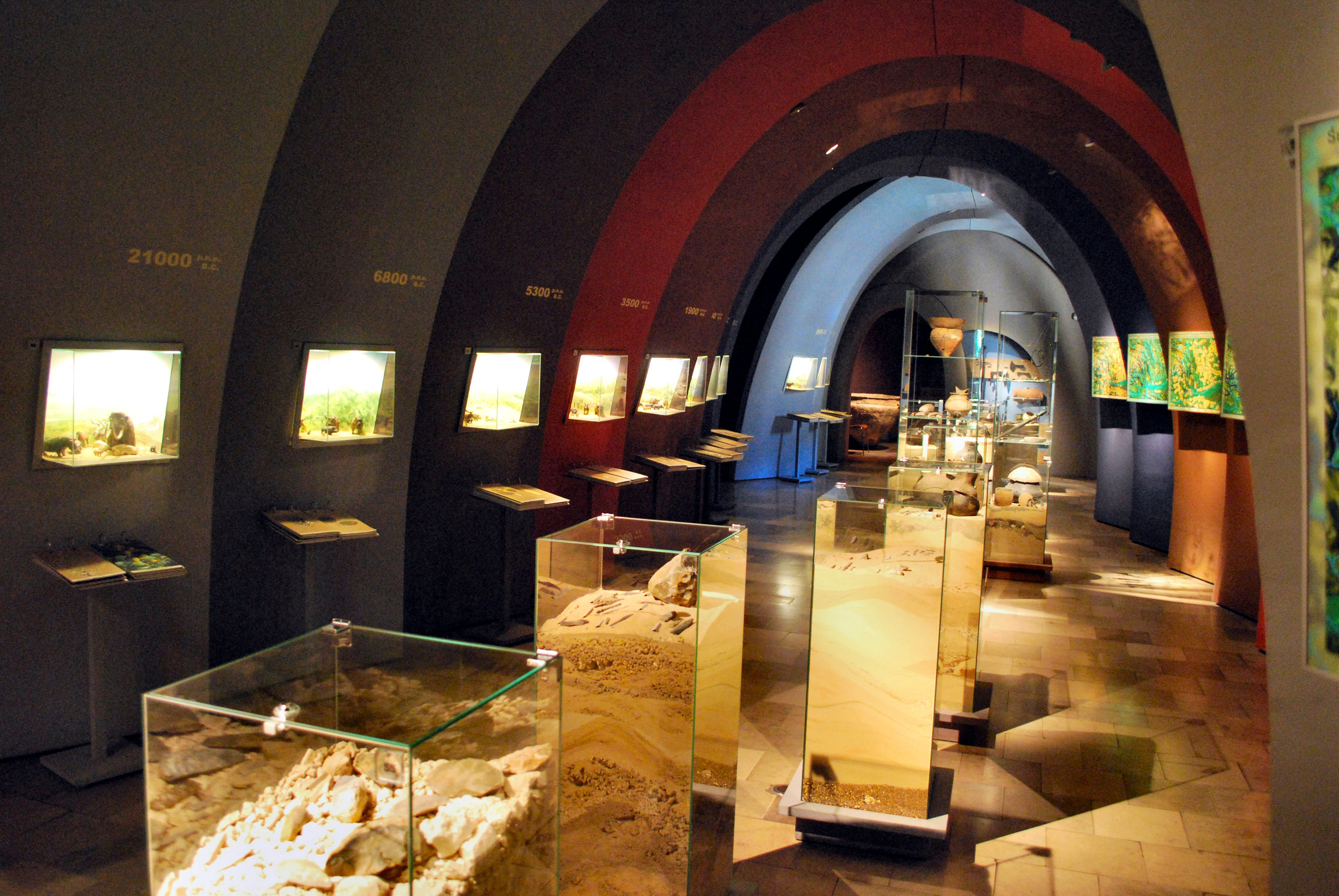
Interior of the museum

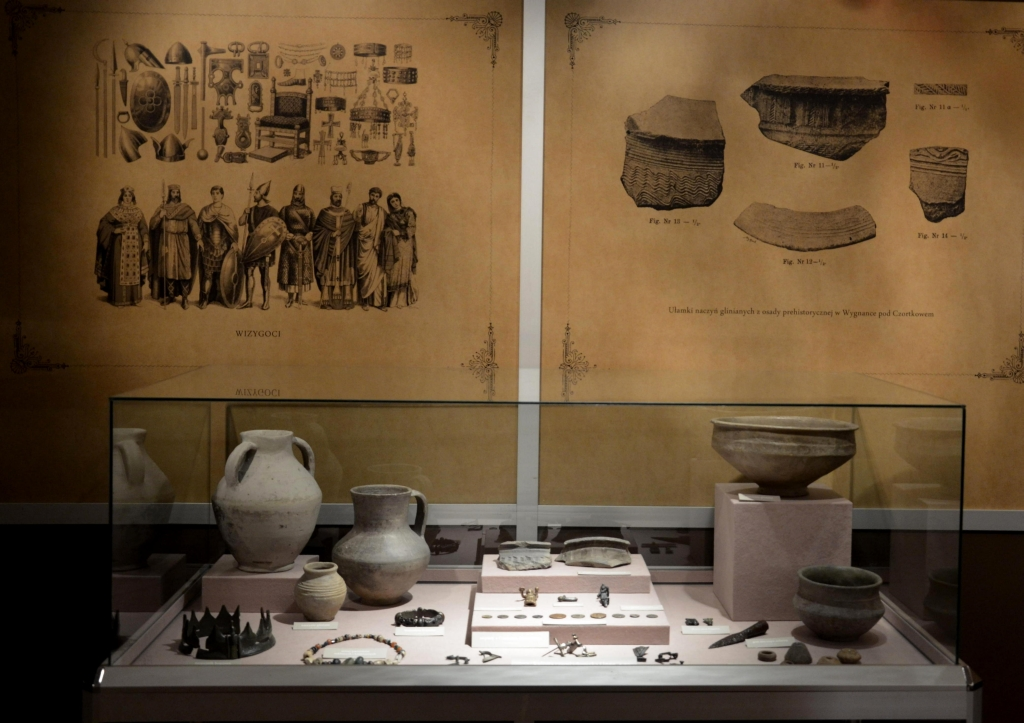
Ostrogothic pottery

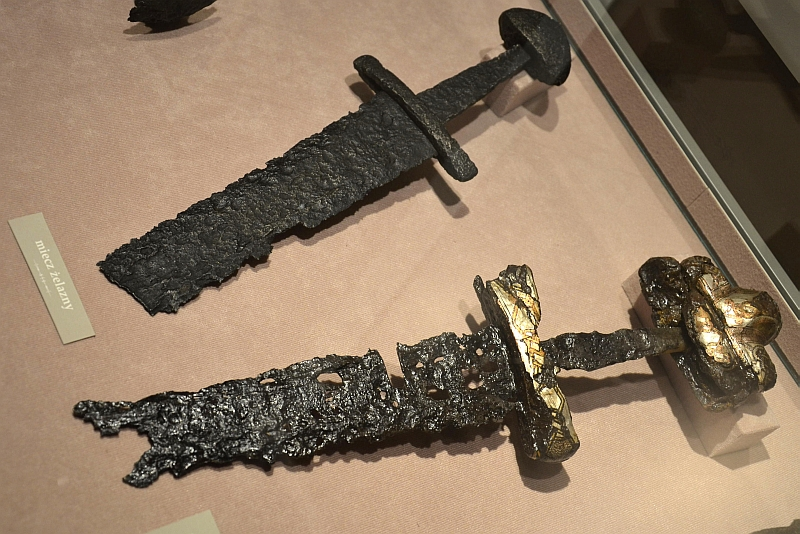
Viking swords

== See also ==
- Museums in Poland
