= Będkowice =

Będkowice may refer to the following places in Poland:

- Będkowice, Lower Silesian Voivodeship (south-west Poland)
- Będkowice, Lesser Poland Voivodeship (south Poland)
