= Twardowski Conjuring Up the Spirit of Barbara Before Sigismund Augustus =

16th-century Polish legend artwork

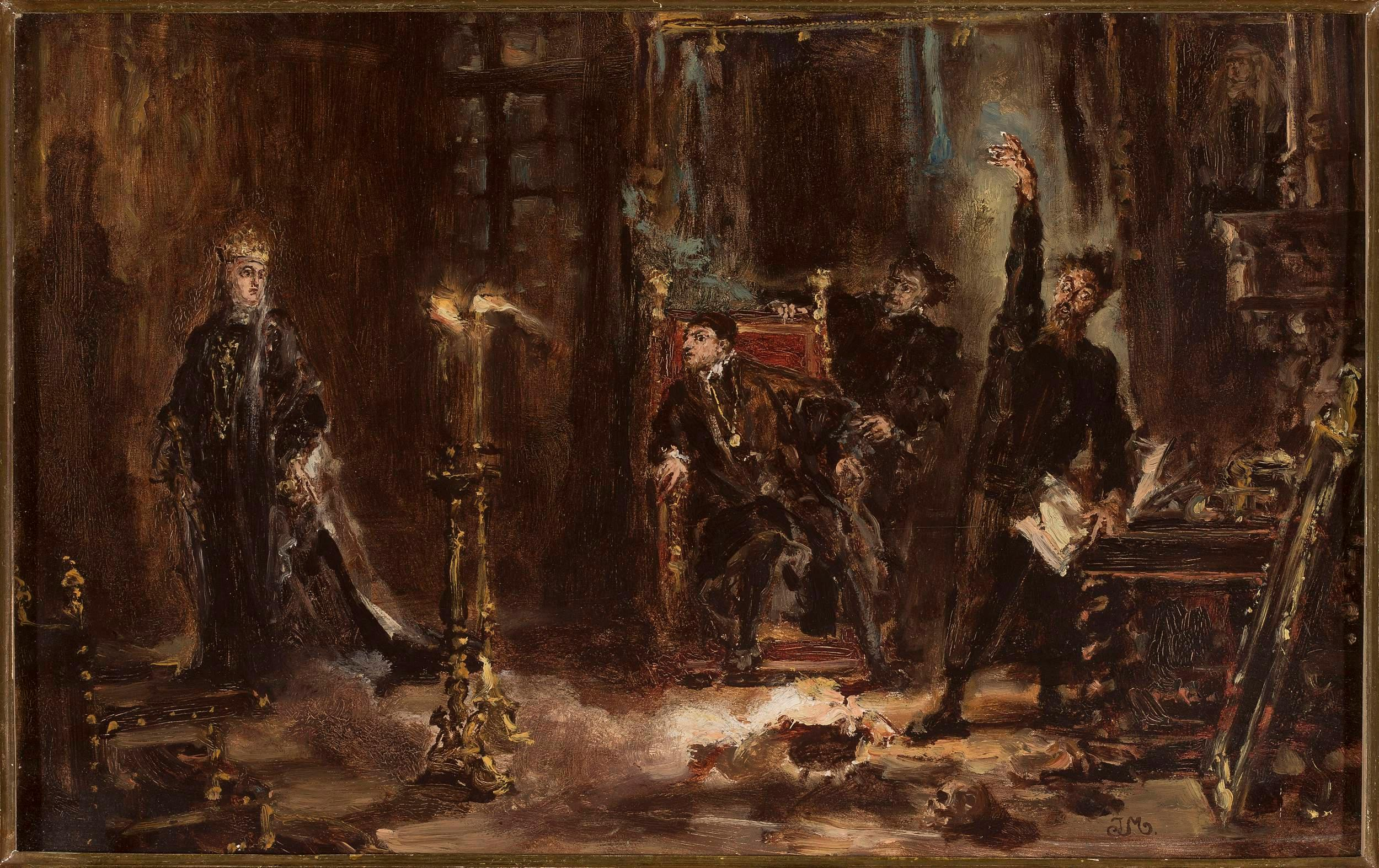
- Artist: Jan Matejko
- Year: 1884
- Medium: oil on canvas
- Location: National Museum, Warsaw

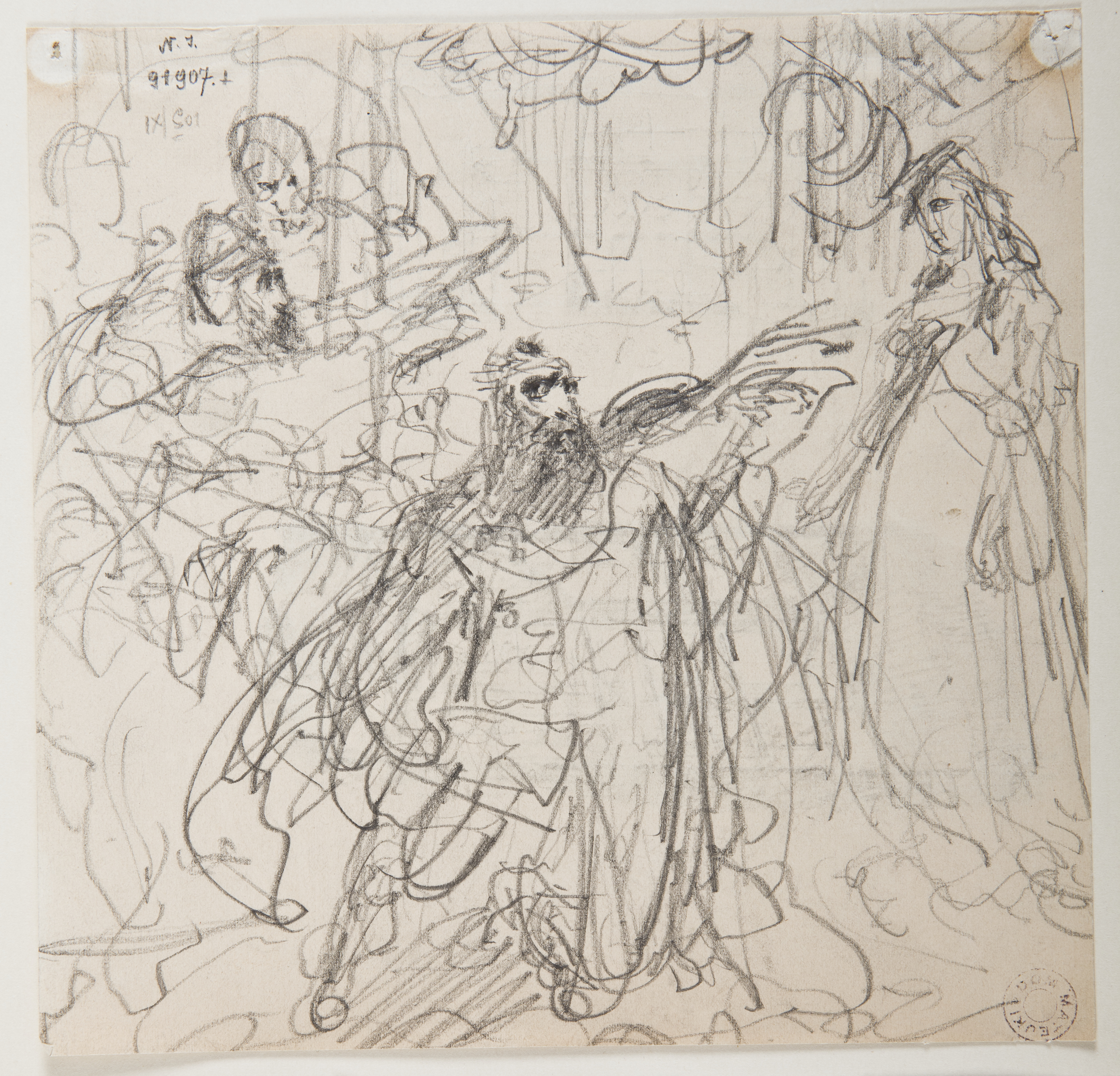
Jan Matejko, sketch for the painting

Twardowski Conjuring Up the Spirit of Barbara Before Sigismund August is a sketch for an unrealized painting by Jan Matejko. Executed on a board measuring 26 × 40 cm, signed with initials on the lower right side: JM. Created in the manor in Krzesławice and transported to Cracow on October 9, 1884, as one of four elaborated historical sketches: Kordecki on the walls of Częstochowa begging for divine help, Bolesław Chrobry at the Golden Gate in Kiev, Bishop Krasiński at the death of Sigismund August, and the mentioned Twardowski invoking the spirit of Barbara before Sigismund August, remaining in this form to this day. It is currently held in the collections of the National Museum in Warsaw.

== Legend ==
During the reign of Sigismund August, a legend circulated about the deep love the king had for his wife, Barbara Radziwiłłówna. After the sudden death of his beloved, the grief-stricken king wished to see her spirit once more. Among all the summoned sorcerers, a certain Twardowski appeared. This man promised the king that he would restore the spirit of his beloved. However, on the day of the ceremony, Twardowski warned the king not to leave his chair during the ritual. When the magical rite began, the figure of the beautiful Barbara emerged from the mirror, floating amidst misty smoke. Sigismund August was overcome with deep feelings of longing and love; he desired to fall before her and embrace her. However, Twardowski forcefully held the king in his seat, preventing him from hasty actions.

— Julian Zinkow, Krakowskie podania, legendy i zwyczaje

There are different versions of this event, one of them suggests that the spirit of Barbara was summoned through a magical lantern, the same one that, enchanted in the rock, still rises in the village of Prądnik Korzkiewski and is called Twardowski's Lantern.

According to another version (Roman Bugaj), a mystification was arranged by placing the king's current favorite, Barbara Giżanka, who bore a striking resemblance to the deceased Barbara, in her stead. All of this was supposed to be organized by the Cracow Chamberlain and royal confidant, Mikołaj Mniszech.

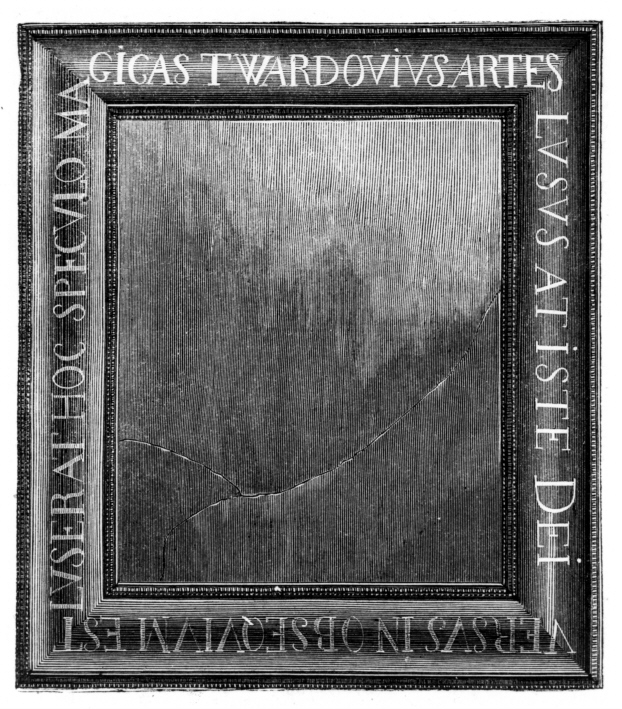
The Twardowski's mirror

Twardowski then utilized the popular method of catoptromancy, which is divination from a mirror, an artifact that has survived to this day. The entire process was supposed to involve invoking the spirit of Radziwiłłówna through its use, as it was allegedly a creation of the devil. It was made in Germany, from a mixture of silver, zinc, antimony, and tin (although some sources state it is made of a gold and silver alloy), framed in black with a Latin inscription.

== Description ==
The painting depicts, in Matejko's characteristic approach to perspective and compositional rendering of figures, his personalized vision of the legendary event—the summoning of the spirit of the deceased Queen Barbara Radziwiłłówna at the request of Sigismund August. The scene unfolds in a dark castle chamber, illuminated by the light of two candles, creating a sublime atmosphere. In the background, centrally positioned in a chair, sits Sigismund August, with his departed beloved appearing to the left by the window. The apparition of Barbara, invoked by the famous legendary sorcerer Twardowski, is on the right side of the painting. Twardowski is portrayed with a raised hand in a gesture of casting a magical spell, and his gaze is fixed on the mirror reflecting Barbara's silhouette. In his left hand, he holds an open book, and at his feet, incense burns, accompanied by a skull. Behind the king's chair, the figure of his trusted courtier is visible, expressing a mix of fear and curiosity. The painting serves as an ideological manifesto through which Matejko contributes to the creation of the tradition of Polish art.

== Bibliography ==
- Marian Gorzkowski (1993). Jan Matejko. Epoka od r. 1861 do końca życia artysty z dziennika prowadzonego w ciągu lat siedemnastu (in Polish). Tow. Przyjaciół Sztuk Pięknych w Krakowie. ISBN 83-7052-167-3.
- Andrzej Jakimowicz (1954), Program ideowy i społeczna funkcja twórczości Matejki na tle rozwoju malarstwa historycznego w Polsce (in Polish), Państwowy Instytut Sztuki
- Krystyna Sroczyńska, ed. (1993). Matejko. Obrazy olejne. Katalog (in Polish). Arkady. ISBN 83-213-3652-3.
- Julian Zinkow (1994). Krakowskie podania, legendy i zwyczaje (in Polish). Verso. ISBN 83-85222-56-1.
