= Wielka Wieś =

Wielka Wieś may refer to the following places:

- Wielka Wieś, Kraków County in Lesser Poland Voivodeship (south Poland)
- Wielka Wieś, Zduńska Wola County in Łódź Voivodeship (central Poland)
- Wielka Wieś, Zgierz County in Łódź Voivodeship (central Poland)
- Wielka Wieś, Miechów County in Lesser Poland Voivodeship (south Poland)
- Wielka Wieś, Tarnów County in Lesser Poland Voivodeship (south Poland)
- Wielka Wieś, Końskie County in Świętokrzyskie Voivodeship (south-central Poland)
- Wielka Wieś, Starachowice County in Świętokrzyskie Voivodeship (south-central Poland)
- Wielka Wieś, Gmina Buk in Greater Poland Voivodeship (west-central Poland)
- Wielka Wieś, Gmina Stęszew in Greater Poland Voivodeship (west-central Poland)
- Wielka Wieś, Wolsztyn County in Greater Poland Voivodeship (west-central Poland)
- Wielka Wieś, Pomeranian Voivodeship (north Poland)
