= Marie-Antoinette Lix =

French educator and fighter

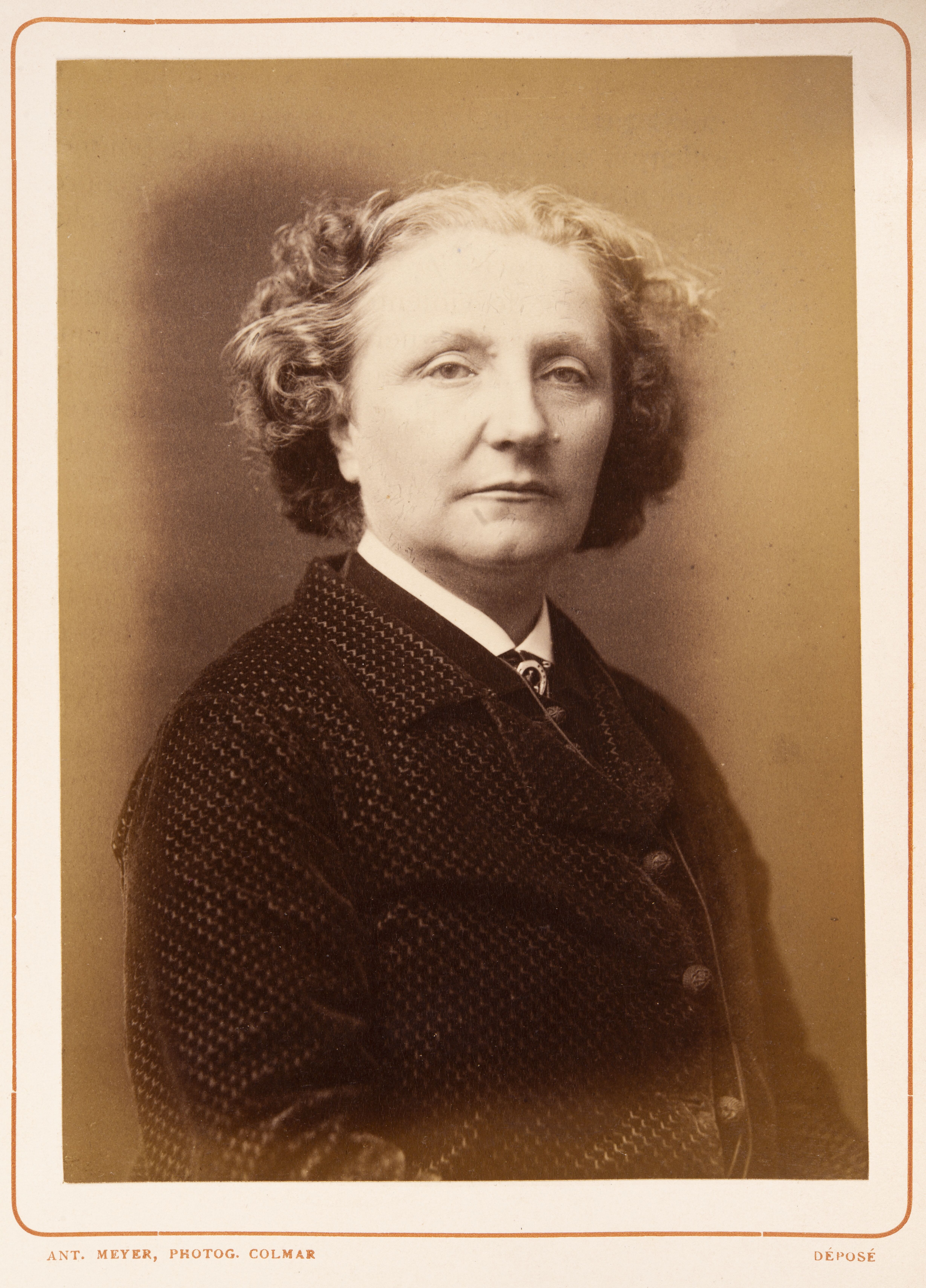
- Born: 31 May 1839; Colmar, Haut-Rhin, Alsace, France
- Died: 14 January 1909 (aged 69); Saint-Nicolas-de-Port, Meurthe-et-Moselle
- Other name: Tony Lix

Marie-Antoinette Lix (31 May 1839 – 14 January 1909) was a French governess and heroine of the 1863–64 January Uprising against Russia who later fought in the Franco-Prussian War.

== Life and career ==
Lix was born in Colmar, Haut-Rhin, Alsace, France to François-Antoine Lix and Françoise Schmitt. She was given a full military education by her father, who later sent her to Sisters of Divine Providence in Ribeauvillé to be further educated. After graduating as a teacher, she became a governess to the Łubieński family, a Polish noble family in Szyce. She joined the Polish insurrection against Russia in 1863, dressed as a man, acted as a courier on the side of the Polish rebels, but was captured by the Russians and then released. She returned to France in 1866.

Following the Battle of Sedan (1870) in the Franco-Prussian War, Lix joined the French Army under General Pierre de Failly. She was a sniper in Lamarche as a lieutenant before joining General Albert Cambriels' troops. She participated in the defense of Vosges and the city of Langres, and distinguished herself during the Battle of Nompatelize on 6 October 1870.

She died in 1909 in Saint-Nicolas-de-Port, Meurthe-et-Moselle. In 1910, an organisation of women of Strasbourg and Colmar donated a silver sword in her honour to the Musée de l'Armée in Paris.
