= The Interior of the Tomb of King Casimir the Great =

1869 oil painting by Jan Matejko

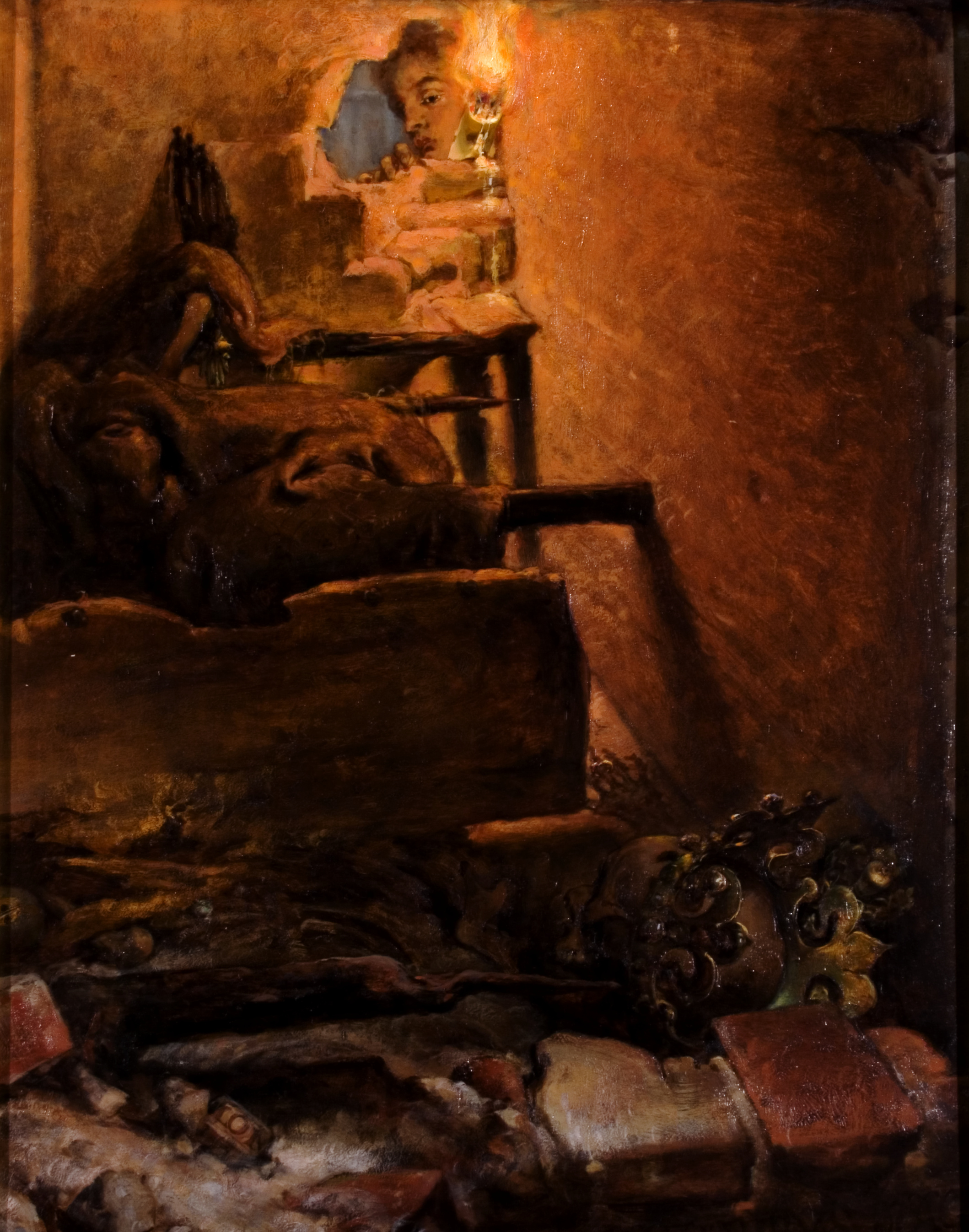
- Artist: Jan Matejko
- Year: 1869
- Catalogue: MNK IX-9
- Medium: oil on cardboard
- Dimensions: 90 cm × 75 cm (35 in × 30 in)
- Location: National Museum in Kraków, Kraków

The interior of the Tomb of King Casimir the Great is an oil on cardboard painting finished by Jan Matejko in 1869. This painting is located in Jan Matejko House, a branch of the National Museum in Kraków.

== Description ==
The painting depicts the excavation works performed on the tomb where Casimir III the Great was laid to rest in 1370. In the foreground is a decrepit brick wall with an inscription in Latin placed in the bottom-right corner that spells out "KAZIMIRUS MAGN", an abbreviation for Kazimirus Magnus (Casimir the Great). Behind the bricks lies a scull bearing a royal crown studded with gems. A detached jaw lies separately near a cluster of loose bones. Another identifiable body part is the foot placed near a hole in the wall. Wooden beams inside of a tomb suggest the former existence of some supporting structure, or more likely a coffin, that has degraded with time. This loose collection of objects in the painting, according to Stanisław Tarnowski, is arranged exactly as it was witnessed on the day of excavation.

The painting has a strongly diagonal composition which uses a one-point perspective to lead the eye of the viewer through the painting's planes deeper into the picture. The orthogonal lines converge at a height of a man's eye, on the right side of the foot. The torch held by a man peering into the tomb is the single source of lighting in the painting.

== Excavations ==
In the 19th century, the poor condition of the tomb of King Casimir III the Great was noted, mobilising the members of The Kraków Academic Society to begin restoration works. A committee consisting of Jan Matejko, Władysław Łuszczkiewicz, Józef Kremer, Paweł Popiel and Teofil Żebrawski was established in 1868 to determine the costs and scope of work. The works started on 13 May 1869 and continued till 19 November of the same year. Restoring the tomb was a means to celebrate the 500th anniversary of issuing the Statues of Casimir the Great.

The restoration works entailed the replacement of the bases of two columns supporting the baldachin, the replacement of the columns supporting the arcades, adding a lily motif to the baldachin, adding new sculptures in place of the missing ones on the sides of the tomb, and filling in losses in cornice. At last, the entirety of the construction was to be marbleised and polished.

To facilitate these changes, the historical tomb had to be dismantled first. It was by coincidence that the ashes of King Casimir the Great were discovered. They were stored in a sandstone container that was revealed after removing the external marble slab from the tomb. The container was promptly sealed and reopened the next day to be examined by Paweł Popiel, Teofil Żebrowski, Sylwester Grzybowski, and Jan Matejko. The discovery was reported in the press and documented by Matejko, who prepared drawings of the royal insignia, spurs, and a scull.
