= Cisie =

Cisie may refer to the following places in Poland:

- Cisie, Lesser Poland Voivodeship (south Poland)
- Cisie, Mińsk County in Masovian Voivodeship (east-central Poland)
- Cisie, Wołomin County in Masovian Voivodeship (east-central Poland)
