= Tadeusz Bartosik =

Polish actor

- Born: 15 May 1925; Modlnica, Poland
- Died: 16 April 1985 (aged 59); Warsaw, Poland
- Occupation: Actor
- Years active: 1959–1985

Tadeusz Bartosik (15 May 1925 – 16 April 1985) was a Polish actor. He appeared in twenty-one films and television shows between 1959 and 1985.

== Selected filmography ==
- Bad Luck (1960)
- Samson (1961)
- Mandrin (1962)
