= Zaryszyn =

- Village
- Location within Poland
- Coordinates: 50°27′18″N 20°15′10″E
- Country: Poland
- Voivodeship: Lesser Poland
- County: Miechów
- Gmina: Książ Wielki
- Population (approx.): 350

Zaryszyn ([zaˈrɨʂɨn]; in old period, probably 600 years ago, was named Zalesie) is a village in the administrative district of Gmina Książ Wielki, within Miechów County, Lesser Poland Voivodeship, in southern Poland.

The village has an approximate population of 350.
