= Wrzosy, Lesser Poland Voivodeship =

Wrzosy
- Village
- Location within Poland
- Coordinates: 50°27′44″N 20°5′11″E
- Country: Poland
- Voivodeship: Lesser Poland
- County: Miechów
- Gmina: Książ Wielki

Wrzosy [ˈvʐɔsɨ] is a village in the administrative district of Gmina Książ Wielki, within Miechów County, Lesser Poland Voivodeship, in southern Poland.
