= Gmina Wielka Wieś =

Gmina Wielka Wieś Wielka Wieś Commune
- Gmina
- Flag Coat of arms

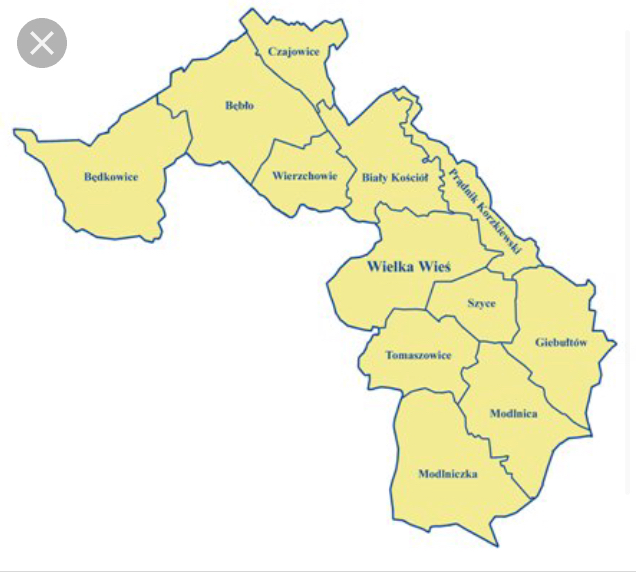
- Coordinates (Wielka Wieś): 50°9′23″N 19°50′36″E
- Country: Poland
- Voivodeship: Lesser Poland
- County: Kraków County
- Seat: Wielka Wieś

Area
  - Total: 48.3 km^{2} (18.6 sq mi)

Population (2010)
  - Total: 9,604
  - Density: 199/km^{2} (515/sq mi)
- Website: http://www.wielka-wies.pl/

Gmina Wielka Wieś is a rural gmina (administrative district) in Kraków County, Lesser Poland Voivodeship, in southern Poland. Its seat is the village of Wielka Wieś, which lies approximately 13 kilometres (8 mi) north-west of the regional capital Kraków.

The gmina covers an area of 48.3 square kilometres (18.6 sq mi), and as of 2010 its total population is 9,604.

The gmina contains part of the protected area called Kraków Valleys Landscape Park.

== Villages ==
Gmina Wielka Wieś contains the villages and settlements of Bębło, Będkowice, Biały Kościół, Czajowice, Giebułtów, Modlnica, Modlniczka, Prądnik Korzkiewski, Szyce, Tomaszowice, Wielka Wieś and Wierzchowie.

== Neighbouring gminas ==
Gmina Wielka Wieś is bordered by the city of Kraków and by the gminas of Jerzmanowice-Przeginia, Skała, Zabierzów and Zielonki.
