= Książ Mały =

- Village
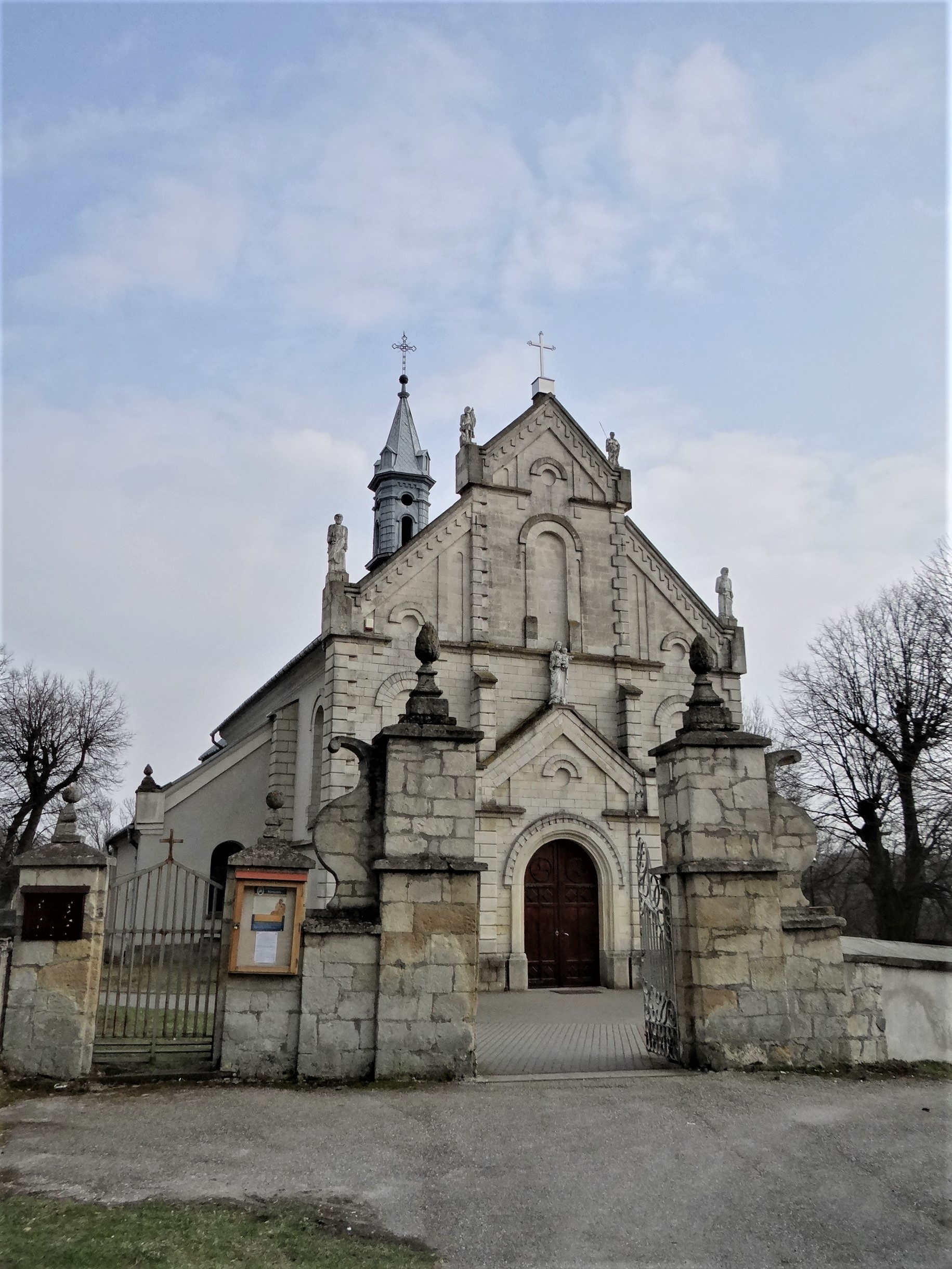
- Catholic church

- Location within Poland
- Coordinates: 50°26′27″N 20°12′34″E
- Country: Poland
- Voivodeship: Lesser Poland
- County: Miechów
- Gmina: Książ Wielki
- Population: 220

Książ Mały [ˈkɕɔ̃ʂ ˈmawɨ] is a village in the administrative district of Gmina Książ Wielki, within Miechów County, Lesser Poland Voivodeship, in southern Poland.
