= Bronocice pot =

Artifact of circa 3500 BCE found in modern Poland

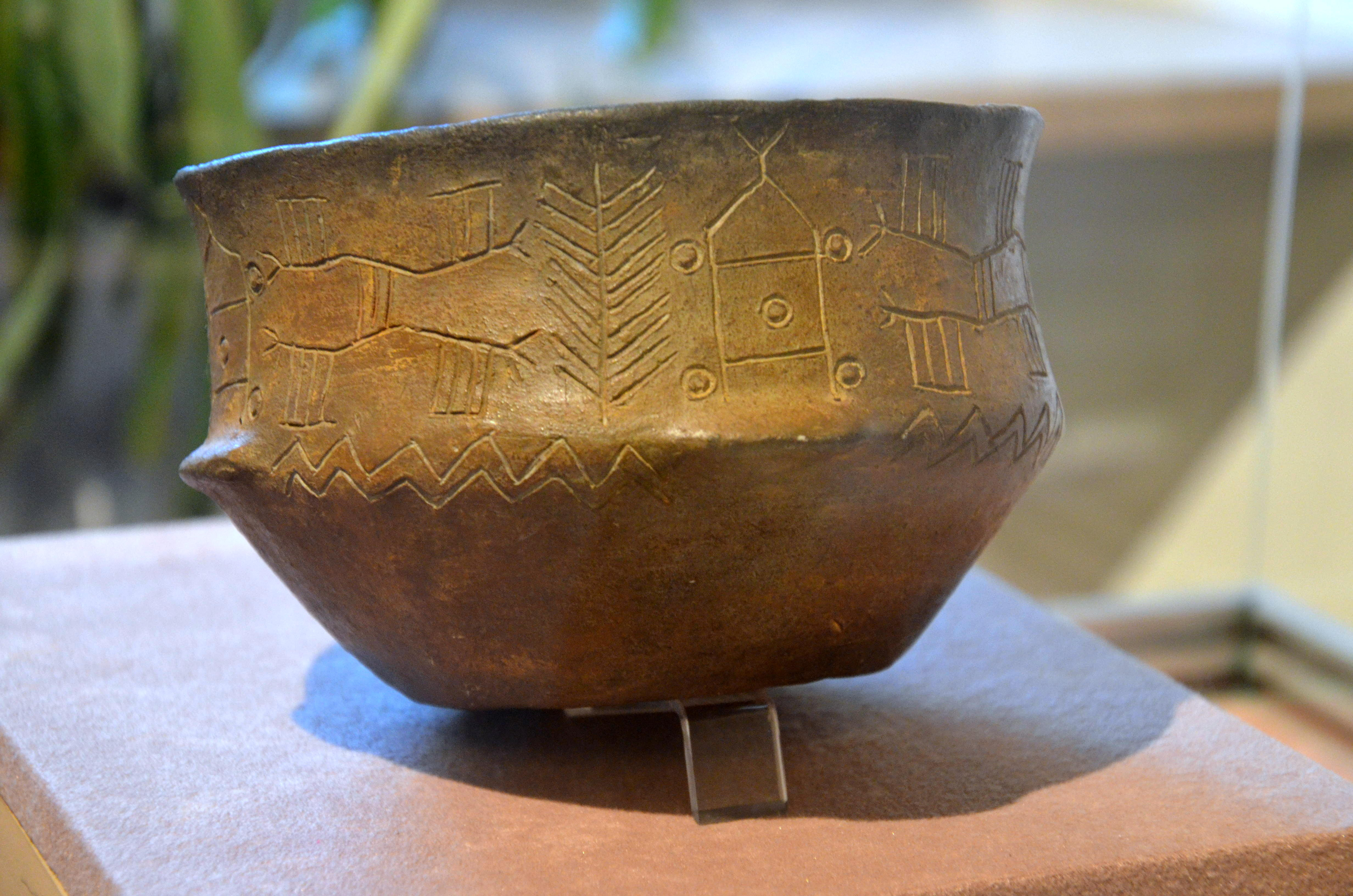
- Created: c. 3500 BC
- Discovered: c. 1975; Bronocice, Świętokrzyskie, Poland
- Present location: Kraków, Lesser Poland, Poland

The Bronocice pot (Polish: Waza z Bronocic) is a ceramic vase incised with one of the earliest known depictions of a wheeled vehicle. It was discovered in the village of Bronocice near the Nidzica River in Świętokrzyskie Voivodeship, in south-central Poland. Attributed to the Funnelbeaker archaeological culture, radiocarbon tests dated the pot to the mid-fourth millennium BCE. Today it is housed at the Archaeological Museum of Kraków in southern Poland.

== Discovery ==
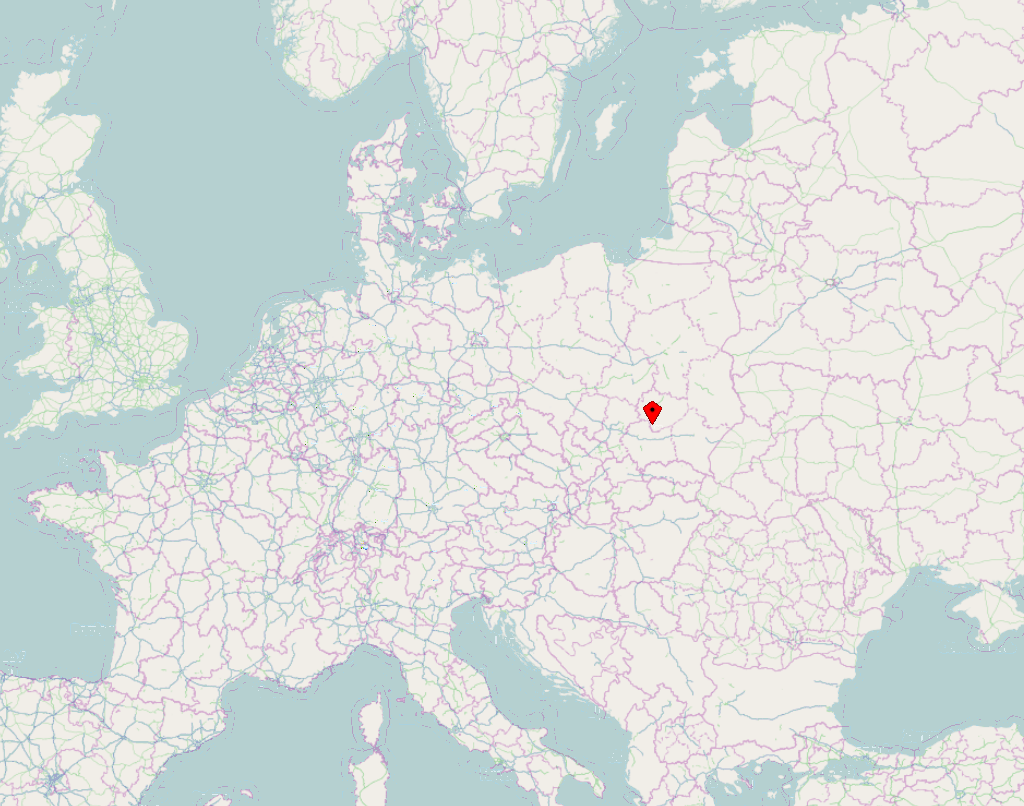
Position of Bronocice

The pot was discovered between 1974 and 1976 during the archaeological excavation of a large Neolithic settlement in Bronocice, ca. 50 km to north east of Kraków. The excavations were carried out between 1974 and 1980 by the Institute of Archaeology and Ethnology, Polish Academy of Sciences and the State University of New York in the United States.

Sarunas Milisauskas, one of several archaeologists who worked on Bronocice excavation project wrote: "The 1974 field season yielded data beyond our expectations. An incised wagon motif was found on a Funnelbeaker vessel in a pit. An animal bone associated with the pot in the pit was dated by radiocarbon method, around 3400 BCE (Bakker et al. 1999). The vessel represents one of the earliest pieces of evidence for the presence of wheeled wagons in Europe." Milisauskas, together with Janusz Kruk, attributed the Neolithic Bronocice findings to the Lublin-Volhynian culture (between 3100 and 2200 BCE), "contemporary to the younger stage of the development of Tiszapolgar cycle in the Cisa River Basin... the culture is certainly older than the decadent period of the Funnelbeaker culture in Małopolska."

== Inscription ==
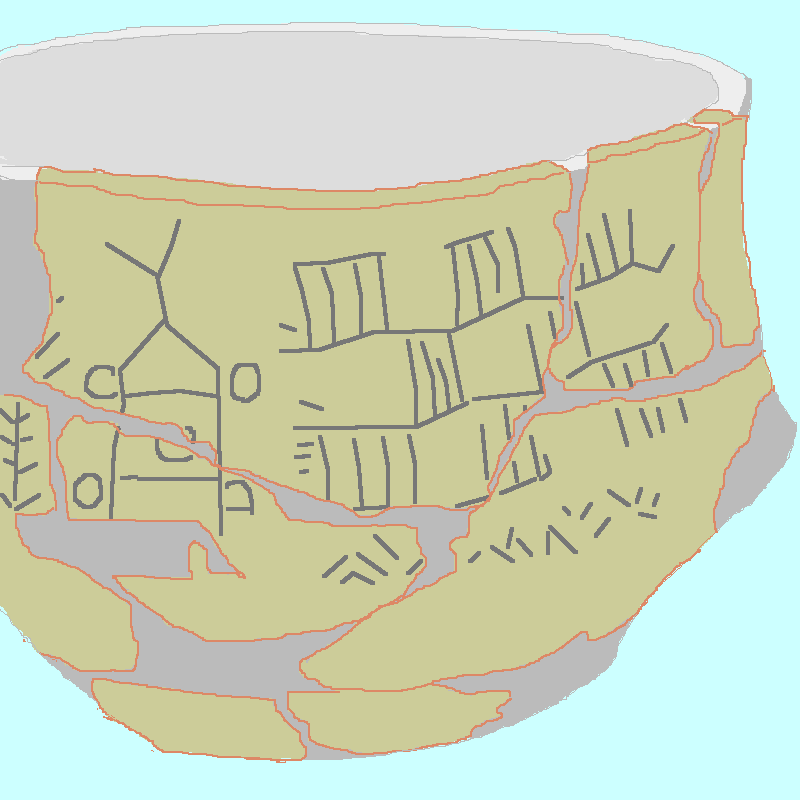
A drawing of the Bronocice pot

A representation of the key element on the pot

The picture on the pot symbolically depicts key elements of the prehistoric human environment. The most important component of the decoration are five rudimentary representations of what seems to be a wagon. They represent a vehicle with a shaft for a draught animal, and four wheels. The lines connecting them probably represent axles. The circle in the middle possibly symbolizes a container for harvest. Other images on the pot include a tree, a river and what may be fields intersected by roads/ditches or the layout of a village.

The Bronocice pot inscription markings may represent a kind of "pre-writing" symbolic system that was suggested by Marija Gimbutas in her model of Old European language, similar to Vinča culture logographics (5700–4500 BCE).

== Historical implications ==
The image on the pot is one of the oldest well-dated representations of a four-wheeled vehicle in the world. It suggests the existence of wagons in Central Europe as early as in the late 4th millennium BCE. They were presumably drawn by aurochs whose remains were found with the pot. Their horns were worn out as if tied with a rope, possibly a result of using a kind of yoke.

Based on the Bronocice discovery, several researchers (Asko Parpola and Christian Carpelan), pointed out that "Indo-European languages possess inherited vocabulary related to wheeled transport", thus providing new research information about the origin of the Indo-European language family. They argue that "the wheeled vehicles were first invented around the middle of the fourth millennium BCE". In his review Theoretical Structural Archeology, Geoff Carter writes: "The site was occupied during the Funnelbeaker or TRB culture phase, one of a complex group of cultures that succeeded the LBK in northern Europe, in the Fifth and Fourth Millennia BCE. Bones from the pit in which the pot was found gave radiocarbon dates of around 3635-3370 BCE". This makes it contemporaneous with the earliest depictions of wheeled wagons found on clay tablet pictographs at the Eanna district of Uruk, in the Sumerian civilization of Mesopotamia (modern Iraq), dated c. 3500–3350 BCE. Several historians argue that there was a diffusion of the wheeled vehicle from the Near East to Europe around the mid-4th millennium BCE. However, all of the earliest evidence for wheeled vehicles, including models, pictorial representations, wheels and vehicle remains, is in Europe, rather than in the Near East. According to Schier (2015), “The present evidence for early wheeled transport does not support the traditional belief in the oriental invention of wheel and wagon", and either wheeled vehicles were invented independently in Europe and Mesopotamia, or else the technology was transferred from Europe to Mesopotamia.
