= Antolka, Lesser Poland Voivodeship =

Antolka
- Village
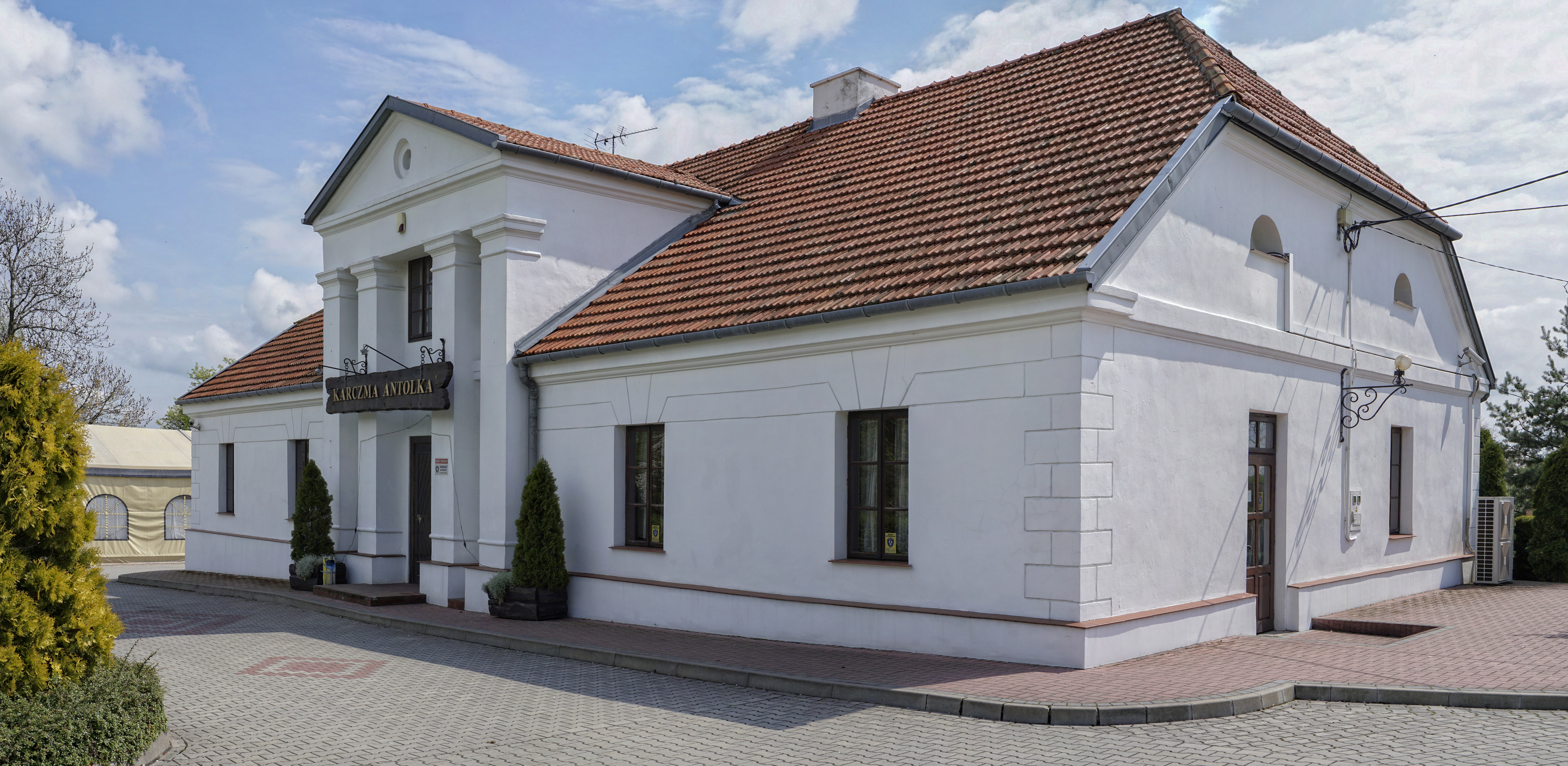
- Inn

- Location within Poland
- Coordinates: 50°24′2″N 20°6′9″E
- Country: Poland
- Voivodeship: Lesser Poland
- County: Miechów
- Gmina: Książ Wielki
- Population: 310

Antolka [anˈtɔlka] is a village in the administrative district of Gmina Książ Wielki, within Miechów County, Lesser Poland Voivodeship, in southern Poland.
