= Bronocice =

- Village
- Location within Poland
- Coordinates: 50°20′24″N 20°21′44″E
- Country: Poland
- Voivodeship: Świętokrzyskie
- County: Pińczów
- Gmina: Działoszyce

Bronocice [brɔnɔˈt͡ɕit͡sɛ] is a village in the administrative district of Gmina Działoszyce, within Pińczów County, Świętokrzyskie Voivodeship, in south-central Poland. It lies approximately 4 km (2 mi) south of Działoszyce, 26 km (16 mi) south-west of Pińczów, and 64 km (40 mi) south of the regional capital Kielce. In 1976 the Bronocice pot was discovered. Dating to approximately 3635–3370 BC, the pot bears the earliest known image of a wheeled vehicle.
