= Łazy, Miechów County =

Łazy
- Village
- Location within Poland
- Coordinates: 50°25′46″N 20°3′40″E
- Country: Poland
- Voivodeship: Lesser Poland
- County: Miechów
- Gmina: Książ Wielki
- Population: 240

Łazy [ˈwazɨ] is a village in the administrative district of Gmina Książ Wielki, within Miechów County, Lesser Poland Voivodeship, in southern Poland.
