= Książ Wielki =

- Town
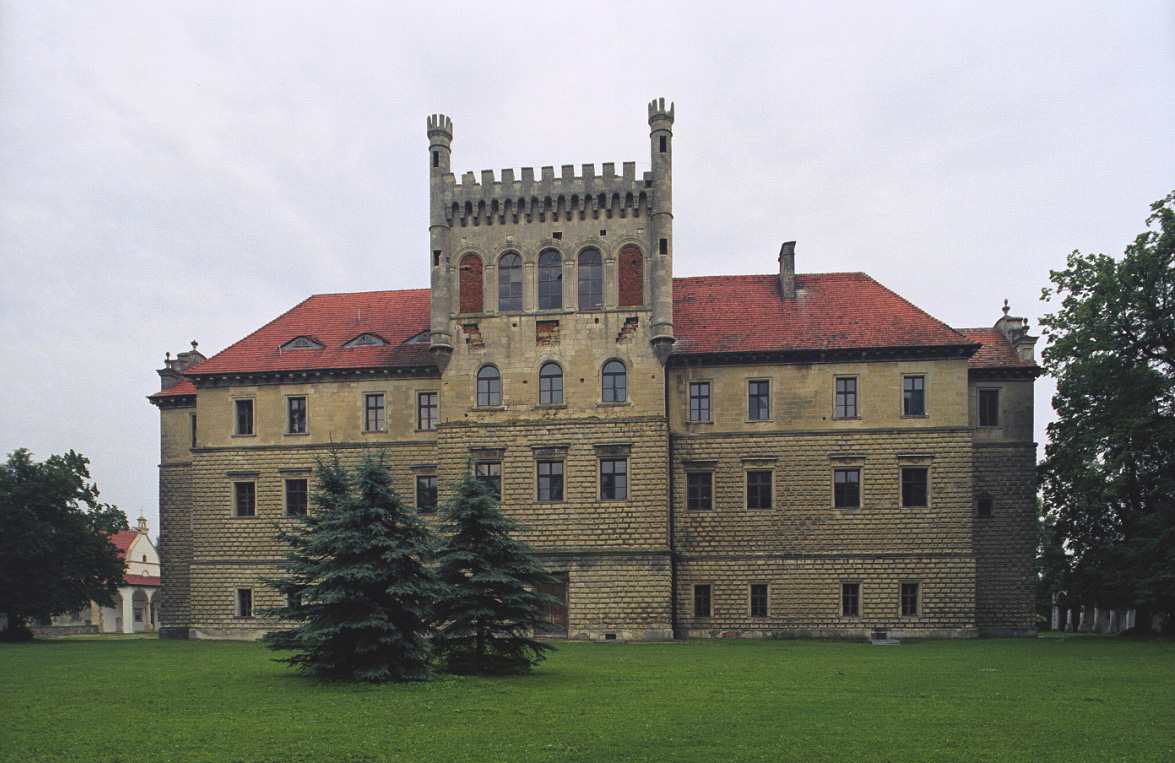
- Castle in Książ Wielki

- Coat of arms

- Location within Poland
- Coordinates: 50°26′32″N 20°8′25″E
- Country: Poland
- Voivodeship: Lesser Poland
- County: Miechów
- Gmina: Książ Wielki
- First mentioned: 1120
- Population: 820
- Time zone: UTC+1 (CET)
  - Summer (DST): UTC+2 (CEST)
- Vehicle registration: KMI

Książ Wielki (Polish pronunciation: [ˈkɕɔ̃ʐ ˈvjɛlkʲi]) is a town in Miechów County, Lesser Poland Voivodeship, in southern Poland. It is the seat of the gmina (administrative district) called Gmina Książ Wielki.

== History ==
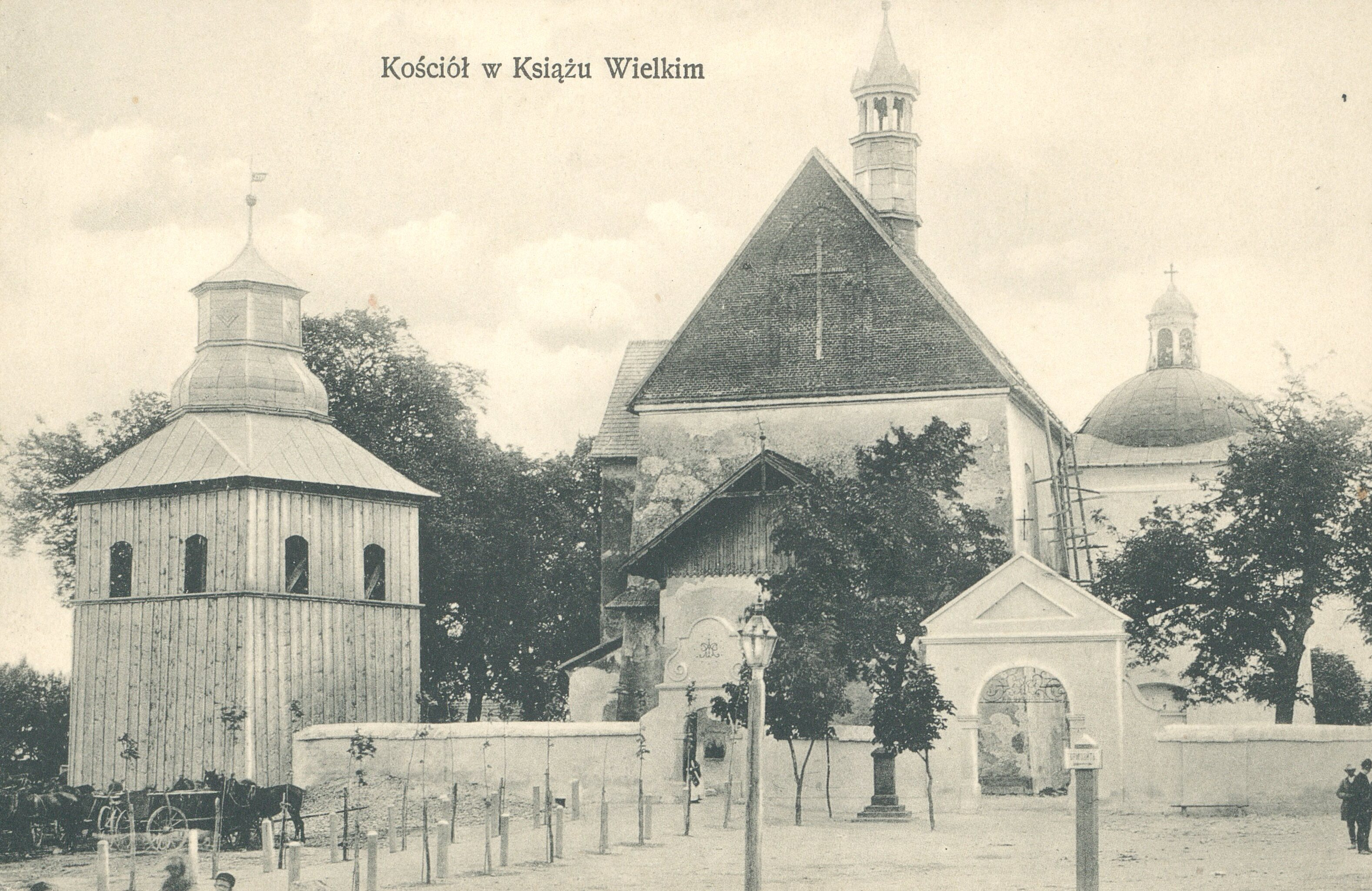
Saint Adalbert church in the early 20th century

The settlement of Książ Wielki was for the first time mentioned in 1120, in chronicles of a Cysterian monastery in Jędrzejów. In the late 14th century the village belonged to Spytek of Melsztyn, and it gained town rights some time between 1333 and 1370. Książ Wielki was administratively located in the Kraków Voivodeship in the Lesser Poland Province, and until the Partitions of Poland was the seat of a county, which included such locations, as Miechów, Wolbrom and Jędrzejów. In the 16th century, the town had a parish school, and was an important center of the Protestant Reformation, especially of Calvinism. In 1795 Książ Wielki was annexed by Austria in the Third Partition of Poland. It was regained by Poles following the Austro-Polish War of 1809, and included within the short-lived Duchy of Warsaw. After the duchy's dissolution in 1815, it became part of the Russian-controlled Congress Kingdom. In 1875, as a punishment for participation of its inhabitants in the January Uprising, the Russians reduced Książ Wielki to the status of a village. Following World War I, Poland regained independence and control of the settlement.

During World War II, it was occupied by Germany. The Polish resistance movement was active in Książ Wielki, including a local unit of the Home Army under the cryptonym "Kozioł" ("Goat"). The Germans opened here a ghetto in 1942. Most of the Jewish population was killed by the occupiers in the Holocaust, and in early August 1944, the Germans burned down the village, killing 12 people for their support of the Home Army.

== Sights ==
Książ Wielki has a Holy Spirit church (1381), and St. Wojciech parish church from the 14th century. There also is a Renaissance palace (1585 - 1595), destroyed during the Kościuszko Uprising, and rebuilt in neo-Gothic style (1841–1846), as well as a synagogue (1846).
