= Częstoszowice =

- Village
- Location within Poland
- Coordinates: 50°25′45″N 20°9′7″E
- Country: Poland
- Voivodeship: Lesser Poland
- County: Miechów
- Gmina: Książ Wielki
- Population: 140

Częstoszowice [t͡ʂɛ̃stɔʂɔˈvit͡sɛ] is a village in the administrative district of Gmina Książ Wielki, within Miechów County, Lesser Poland Voivodeship, in southern Poland.
