= Konaszówka =

- Village
- Location within Poland
- Coordinates: 50°26′41″N 20°8′26″E
- Country: Poland
- Voivodeship: Lesser Poland
- County: Miechów
- Gmina: Książ Wielki
- Population: 260

Konaszówka [kɔnaˈʂufka] is a village in the administrative district of Gmina Książ Wielki, within Miechów County, Lesser Poland Voivodeship, in southern Poland.
