= Mianocice =

- Village
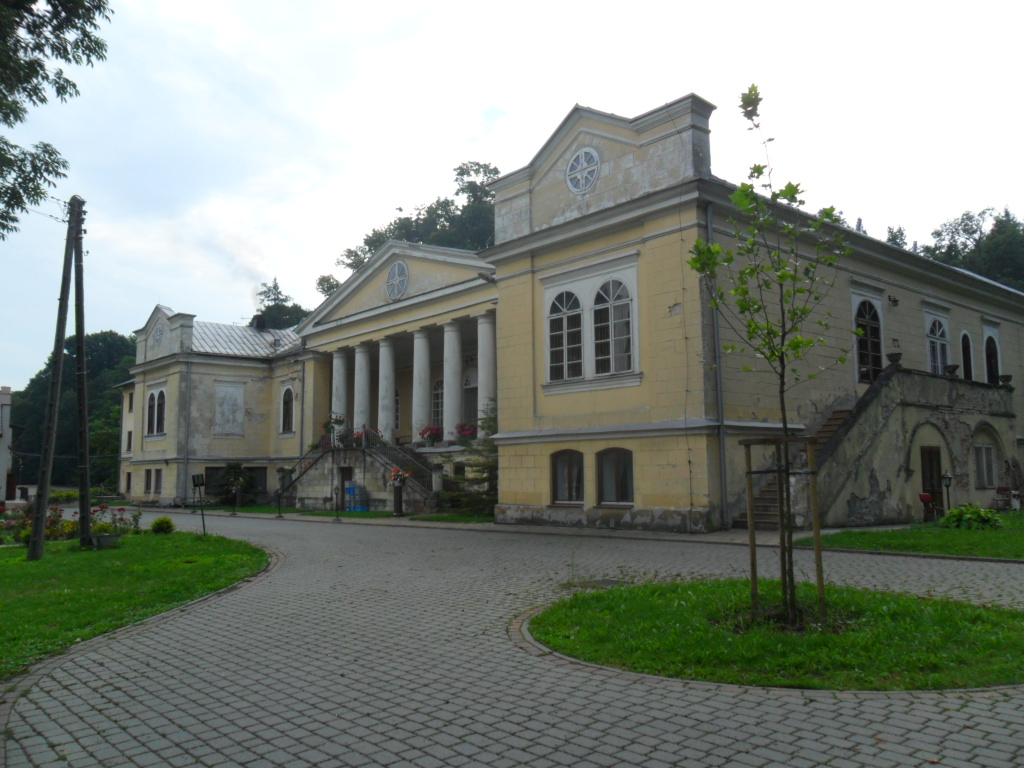
- Palace in Mianocice

- Location within Poland
- Coordinates: 50°26′13″N 20°6′37″E
- Country: Poland
- Voivodeship: Lesser Poland
- County: Miechów
- Gmina: Książ Wielki
- Population: 330

Mianocice [mjanɔˈt͡ɕit͡sɛ] is a village in the administrative district of Gmina Książ Wielki, within Miechów County, Lesser Poland Voivodeship, in southern Poland.
