= Małoszów, Lesser Poland Voivodeship =

Małoszów
- Village
- Location within Poland
- Coordinates: 50°24′38″N 20°9′8″E
- Country: Poland
- Voivodeship: Lesser Poland
- County: Miechów
- Gmina: Książ Wielki
- Population: 110

Małoszów [maˈwɔʂuf] is a village in the administrative district of Gmina Książ Wielki, within Miechów County, Lesser Poland Voivodeship, in southern Poland.
