= Moczydło, Lesser Poland Voivodeship =

Moczydło
- Village
- Location within Poland
- Coordinates: 50°28′29″N 20°11′14″E
- Country: Poland
- Voivodeship: Lesser Poland
- County: Miechów
- Gmina: Książ Wielki

Moczydło [mɔˈt͡ʂɨdwɔ] is a village in the administrative district of Gmina Książ Wielki, within Miechów County, Lesser Poland Voivodeship, in southern Poland.
