= Gmina Książ Wielki =

Gmina Książ Wielki Książ Wielki Commune
- Gmina
- Coat of arms
- Interactive map of Gmina Książ Wielki
- Coordinates (Książ Wielki): 50°26′32″N 20°8′25″E
- Country: Poland
- Voivodeship: Lesser Poland
- County: Miechów
- Seat: Książ Wielki

Area
  - Total: 137.8 km^{2} (53.2 sq mi)

Population (2006)
  - Total: 5,565
  - Density: 40.38/km^{2} (104.6/sq mi)

Gmina Książ Wielki is a rural gmina (administrative district) in Miechów County, Lesser Poland Voivodeship, in southern Poland. Its seat is the village of Książ Wielki, which lies approximately 13 kilometres (8 mi) north-east of Miechów and 45 km (28 mi) north of the regional capital Kraków.

The gmina covers an area of 137.8 square kilometres (53.2 sq mi), and as of 2006 its total population is 5,565.

== Villages ==
Gmina Książ Wielki contains the villages and settlements of Antolka, Boczkowice, Cisia Wola, Cisie, Częstoszowice, Giebułtów, Głogowiany, Konaszówka, Krzeszówka, Książ Mały, Książ Mały-Kolonia, Książ Wielki, Łazy, Małoszów, Mianocice, Moczydło, Rzędowice, Stara Wieś, Tochołów, Trzonów, Wielka Wieś, Wrzosy and Zaryszyn.

== Neighbouring gminas ==
Gmina Książ Wielki is bordered by the gminas of Charsznica, Działoszyce, Kozłów, Miechów, Słaboszów and Wodzisław.
