= Boczkowice, Lesser Poland Voivodeship =

Boczkowice
- Village
- Location within Poland
- Coordinates: 50°25′37″N 20°12′26″E
- Country: Poland
- Voivodeship: Lesser Poland
- County: Miechów
- Gmina: Książ Wielki
- Population: 230

Boczkowice [bɔt͡ʂkɔˈvit͡sɛ] is a village in the administrative district of Gmina Książ Wielki, within Miechów County, Lesser Poland Voivodeship, in southern Poland.
