= Stara Wieś, Miechów County =

Stara Wieś
- Village
- Location within Poland
- Coordinates: 50°29′5″N 20°11′27″E
- Country: Poland
- Voivodeship: Lesser Poland
- County: Miechów
- Gmina: Książ Wielki

Stara Wieś [ˈstara ˈvjɛɕ] is a village in the administrative district of Gmina Książ Wielki, within Miechów County, Lesser Poland Voivodeship, in southern Poland.
