= Wierzchowie =

- Village
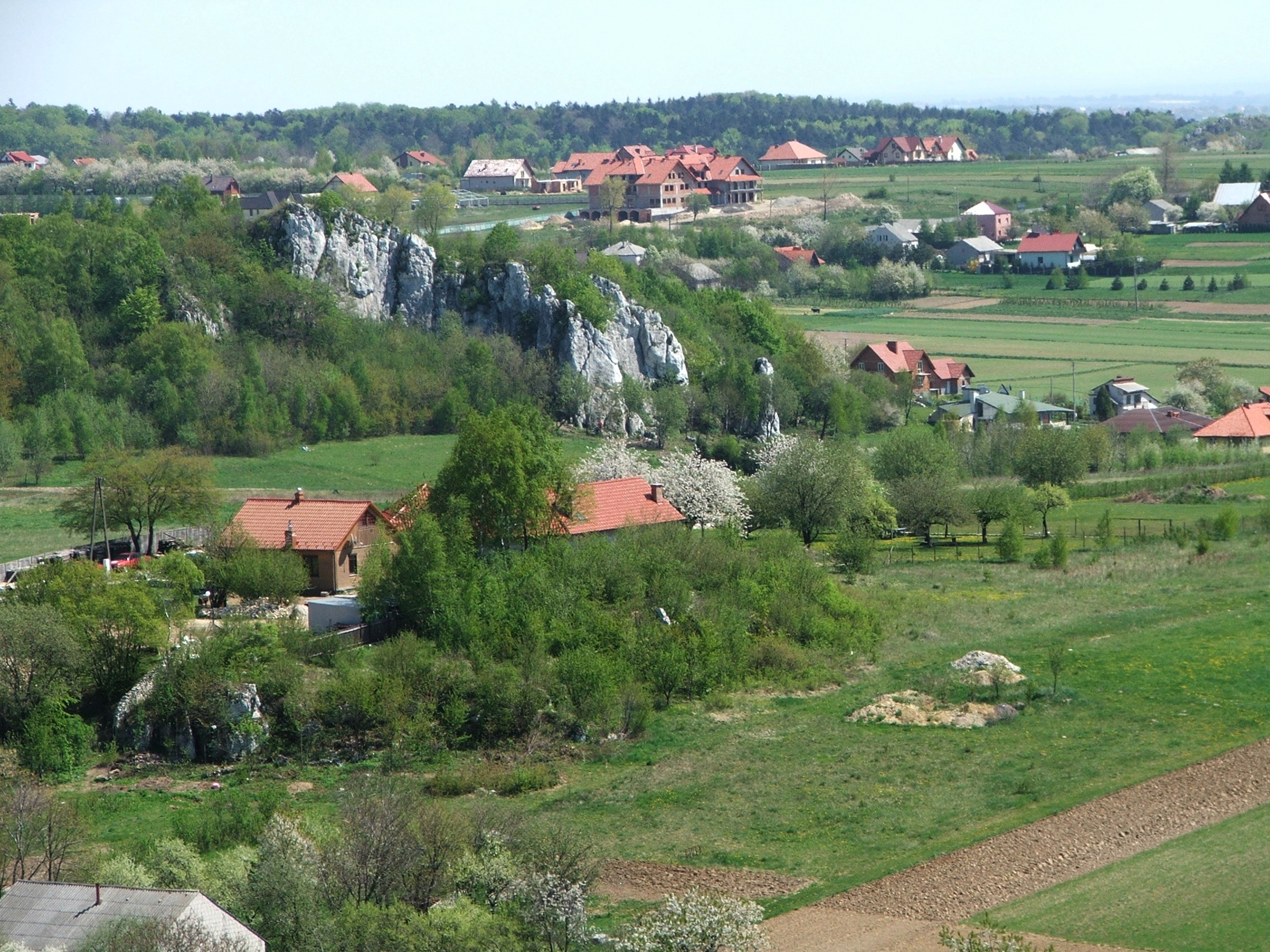

- Location within Poland
- Coordinates: 50°10′N 19°48′E
- Country: Poland
- Voivodeship: Lesser Poland
- County: Kraków
- Gmina: Wielka Wieś

Wierzchowie [vjɛʂˈxɔvjɛ] is a village in the administrative district of Gmina Wielka Wieś, within Kraków County, Lesser Poland Voivodeship, in southern Poland.
