= Tomaszowice, Lesser Poland Voivodeship =

Tomaszowice
- Village
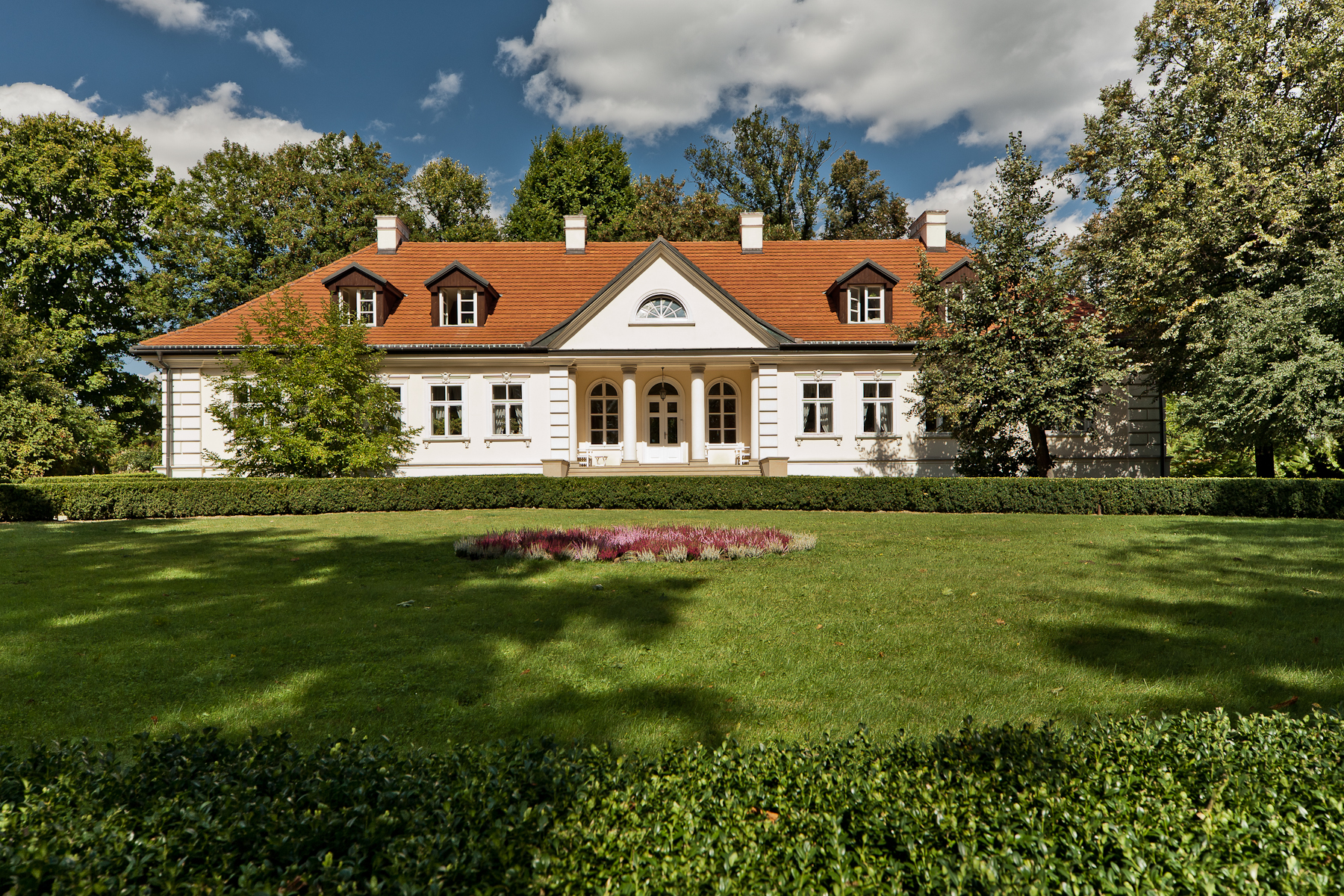
- Manor house

- Location within Poland
- Coordinates: 50°8′N 19°51′E
- Country: Poland
- Voivodeship: Lesser Poland
- County: Kraków
- Gmina: Wielka Wieś

Tomaszowice [tɔmaʂɔˈvit͡sɛ] is a village in the administrative district of Gmina Wielka Wieś, within Kraków County, Lesser Poland Voivodeship, in southern Poland. The village is located in the historical region Galicia.
