= Giebułtów, Miechów County =

Giebułtów
- Village
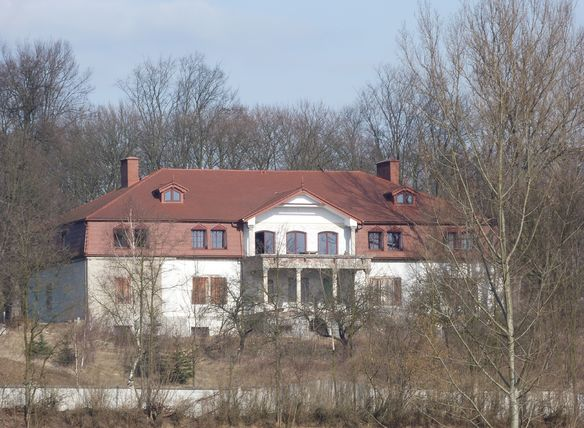
- Manor house

- Location within Poland
- Coordinates: 50°24′15″N 20°10′0″E
- Country: Poland
- Voivodeship: Lesser Poland
- County: Miechów
- Gmina: Książ Wielki
- Population: 250

Giebułtów [ɡʲɛˈbuu̯tuf] is a village in the administrative district of Gmina Książ Wielki, within Miechów County, Lesser Poland Voivodeship, in southern Poland.
