= Wielka Wieś, Miechów County =

Wielka Wieś
- Village
- Location within Poland
- Coordinates: 50°26′45″N 20°9′32″E
- Country: Poland
- Voivodeship: Lesser Poland
- County: Miechów
- Gmina: Książ Wielki
- Population: 270

Wielka Wieś [ˈvjɛlka ˈvjɛɕ] is a village in the administrative district of Gmina Książ Wielki, within Miechów County, Lesser Poland Voivodeship, in southern Poland.
