= Biały Kościół, Lesser Poland Voivodeship =

Biały Kościół
- Village
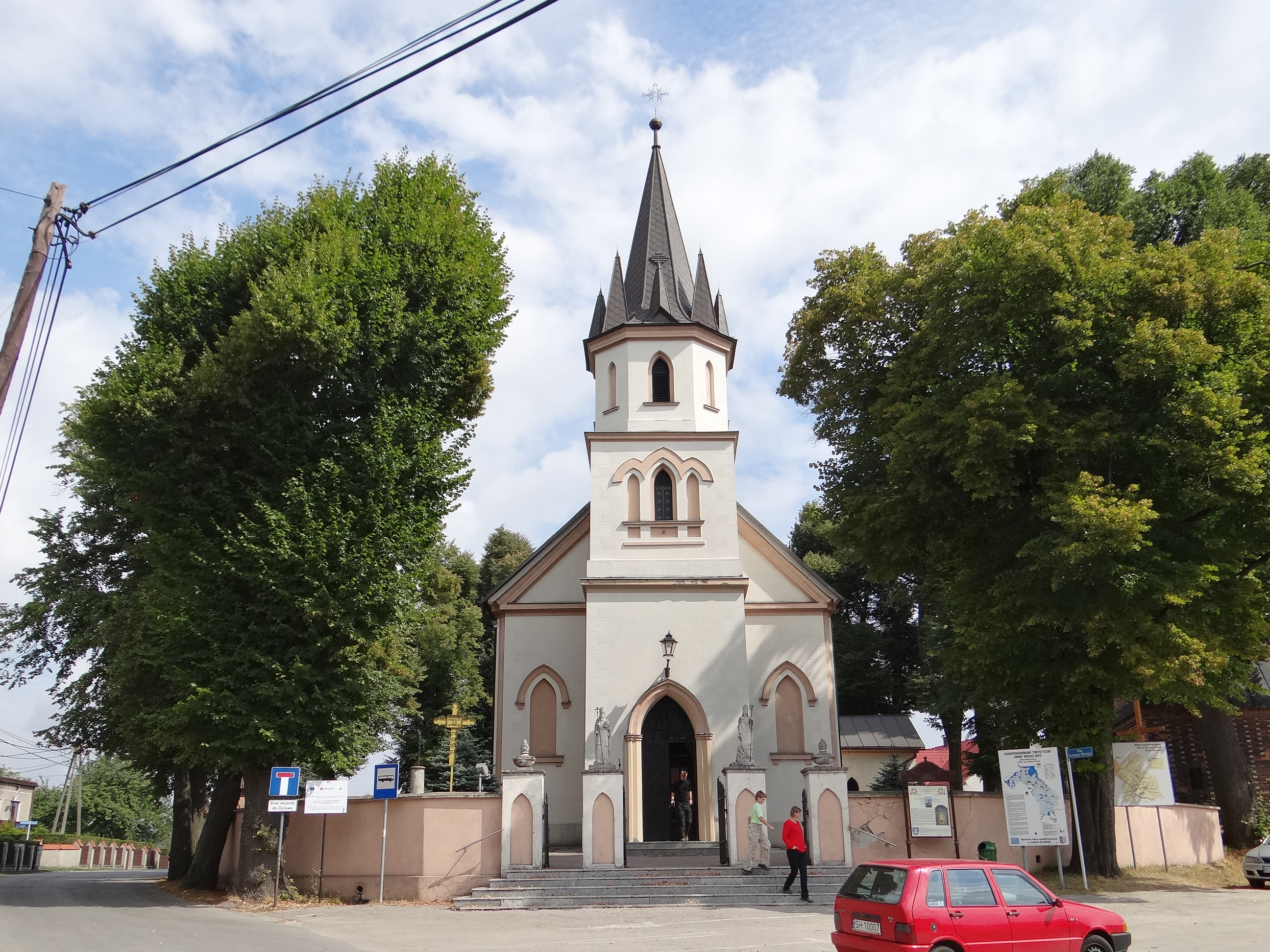
- Catholic church

- Location within Poland
- Coordinates: 50°10′3″N 19°49′39″E
- Country: Poland
- Voivodeship: Lesser Poland
- County: Kraków
- Gmina: Wielka Wieś
- Population: 950
- Website: http://bialy-kosciol.ovh.org/

Biały Kościół [ˈbjawɨ ˈkɔɕt͡ɕuu̯] is a village in the administrative district of Gmina Wielka Wieś, within Kraków County, Lesser Poland Voivodeship, in southern Poland.
