= Teofil Żebrawski =

Polish polymath

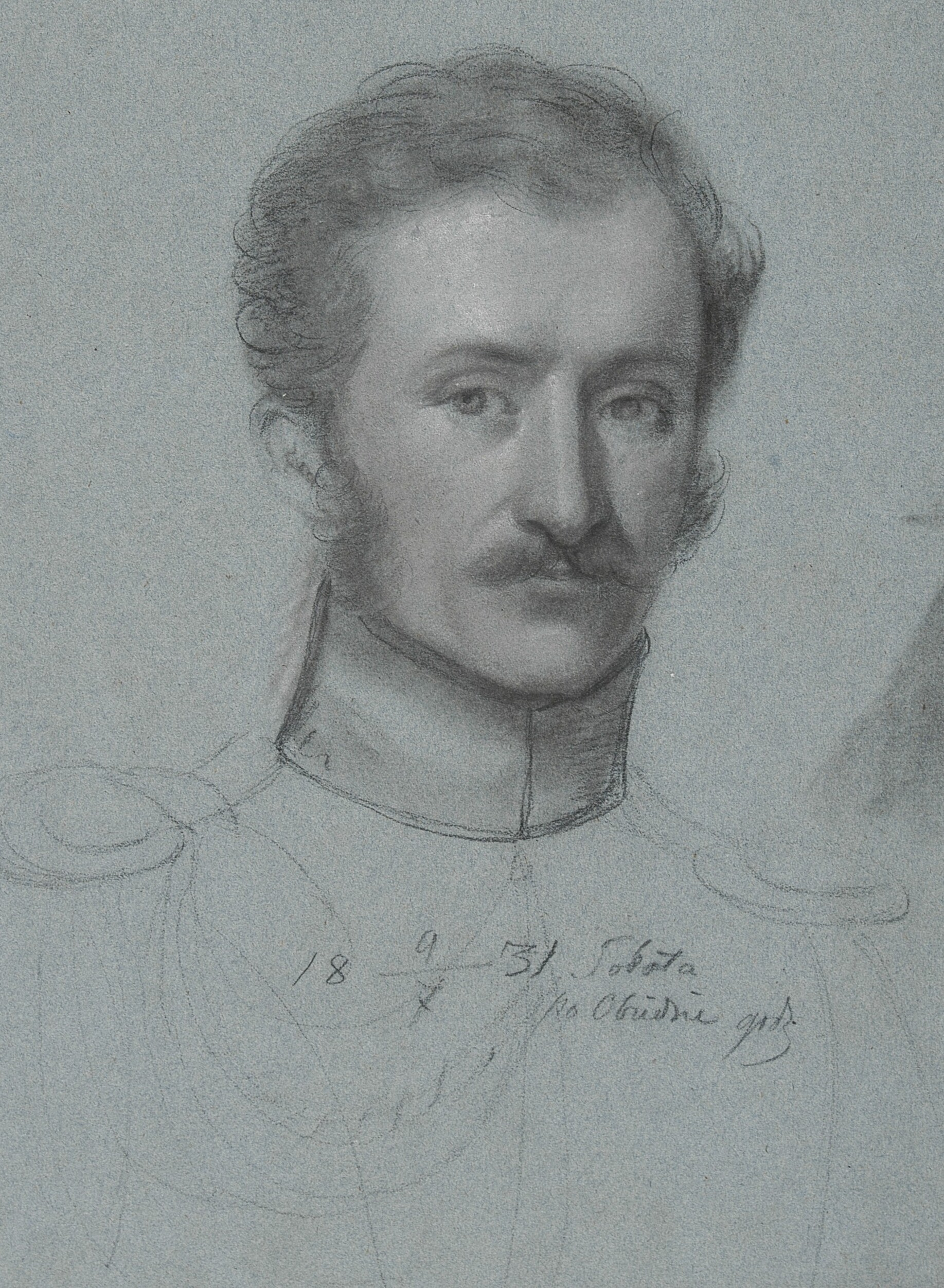
Teofil Żebrawski, self-portrait, 1830

Teofil Wincenty Żebrawski (Polish pronunciation: [tɛˈɔ.fil ʐɛbrafski]; 5 April 1800 – 5 February 1887) was a Polish mathematician, bibliographer, architect, biologist, archeologist, cartographer and geodesist; an erudite and polymath. Pioneer of the modern Polish mathematical bibliography.

He was an author of works mainly about road, iron road and bridge constructions, cartography, topography and entomology. Author of Polish, French and German dictionary of architecture, building engineering and materials science terms. Author and publisher of Free City of Kraków maps from 1833, city map of Kraków from 1834 and health resorts map of Galicia and Bukowina. Żebrawski derived the chain curve formula and applied it to the bridge arc calculations. He published a paper on the main causes of train derailment and its present methods. He introduced his own method of maps and map graticule classification. He researched and described changes in fauna of butterflies in Kraków region. Żebrawski directed restorations of Dominicans Church in Kraków, altars of St. Mary's Basilica and Royal Graves of the Wawel Cathedral.

Żebrawski was also a translator. His notable translations to Polish language includes The Poems of Ossian originally written by James Macpherson and Diversarum Artium Schedula — Libri III by Theophilus Presbyter.

He participated in the November Uprising (1830–1831) as a First Lieutenant-Engineer (porucznik-inżynier) of Józef Dwernicki corps and in the Kraków Uprising (1846) as a captain (kapitan).

== Biography ==
Żebrawski was born on 5 April 1800 in Wojnicz, West Galicia. In 1818 he graduated from Bartłomiej Nowodworski High School in Kraków. After that, he studied philosophy, nature, English philology, mathematics and astronomy at the Jagiellonian University in Kraków, and mining, building engineering and topography at the Szkoła Akademiczno-Górnicza in Kielce. In 1832 he graduated doctor of philosophy and liberal science at the Jagiellonian University. In the years of 1832–1834 he worked as a lecturer and then adjunct of the Natural History and Botanics Department at the Jagiellonian University. In 1837–1853 he worked as a land and water transport inspector of Kraków.

In 1830s, Żebrawski designed and built a road through the Free City of Kraków with two bridges over Krzeszówka and Dłubnia. Between 1825 and 1831, he made a triangulation of Dobrzyń Land, Pułtusk obwód, Świętokrzyskie Mountains, Sandomierz region, regions between Warsaw, Włodawa and Bug, and Wilno Governorate region. Part of these measurements were used in the 1839 map of the Kingdom of Poland.

In 1866, he became a member of the Kraków Science Society (Towarzystwo Naukowe Krakowskie) and in 1872, member of the Academy of Learning (Akademia Umiejętności).

He died in Kraków on 5 February 1887.

== Notable works ==
- O sieciach do kart geograficznych, astronomicznych i morskich (1831)
- Dopełnienie dawnej bibliografii polskiej (1838)
- O moście wiszący (1841)
- Początkowe wiadomości z geometryi dla praktycznego użytku. Część I. Planimetryja (1849)
- O przyczynach wykolejenia pociągów na drogach żelaznych i środkach zapobieżania temu (1850)
- Wiadomość o bożyszczu słowiańskim znalezionym w Zbruczu (1858)
- Owady łuskoskrzydłe, czyli motylowate z okolic Krakowa (1860)
- Wiadomość o Adamie Kochańskim i pismach jego matematycznych (1862)
- Nasze zabytki (1865–1871)
- Bibliografija piśmiennictwa polskiego z działu matematyki i fizyki oraz ich zastósowań (1873)
- Słownik wyrazów technicznych tyczących się budownictwa (1883)
- Dodatki do bibliografii piśmiennictwa polskiego z działu matematyki i fizyki oraz ich zastósowań (1886)
