= Modlnica =

- Village
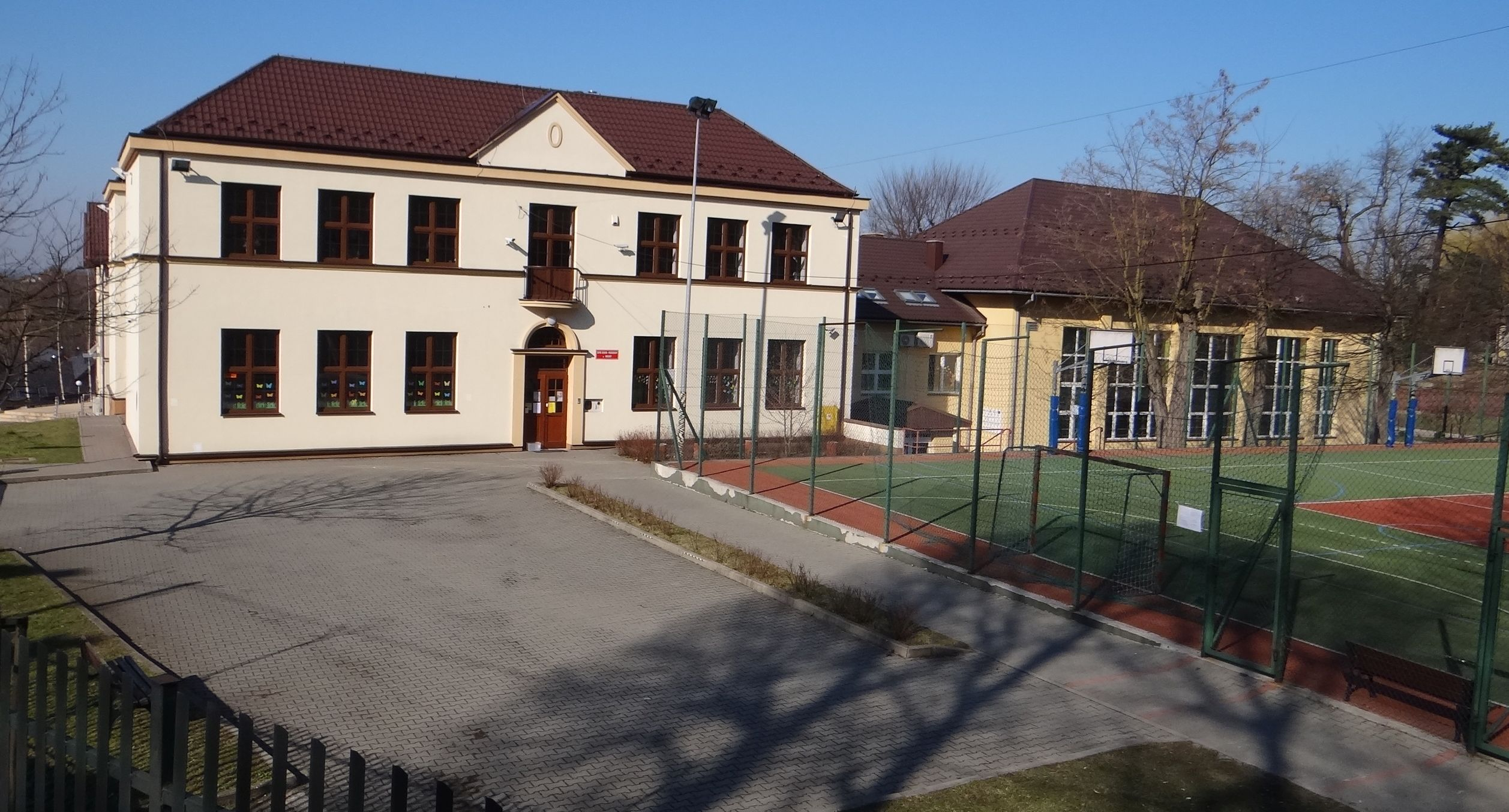
- School

- Location within Poland
- Coordinates: 50°7′45″N 19°52′1″E
- Country: Poland
- Voivodeship: Lesser Poland
- County: Kraków
- Gmina: Wielka Wieś
- Elevation: 350 m (1,150 ft)
- Population: 1,164

Modlnica [mɔdlˈnit͡sa] is a village in the administrative district of Gmina Wielka Wieś, within Kraków County, Lesser Poland Voivodeship, in southern Poland.
