= Krzeszówka =

- Village
- Location within Poland
- Coordinates: 50°27′6″N 20°12′4″E
- Country: Poland
- Voivodeship: Lesser Poland
- County: Miechów
- Gmina: Książ Wielki
- Population: 190

Krzeszówka [kʂɛˈʂufka] is a village in the administrative district of Gmina Książ Wielki, within Miechów County, Lesser Poland Voivodeship, in southern Poland.
