= Wielka Wieś, Kraków County =

Wielka Wieś
- Village
- Location within Poland
- Coordinates: 50°9′23″N 19°50′36″E
- Country: Poland
- Voivodeship: Lesser Poland
- County: Kraków
- Gmina: Wielka Wieś
- Population: 1,063

Wielka Wieś [ˈvjɛlka ˈvjɛɕ] is a village in Kraków County, Lesser Poland Voivodeship, in southern Poland. It is the seat of the gmina (administrative district) called Gmina Wielka Wieś.
