= Bębło =

- Village
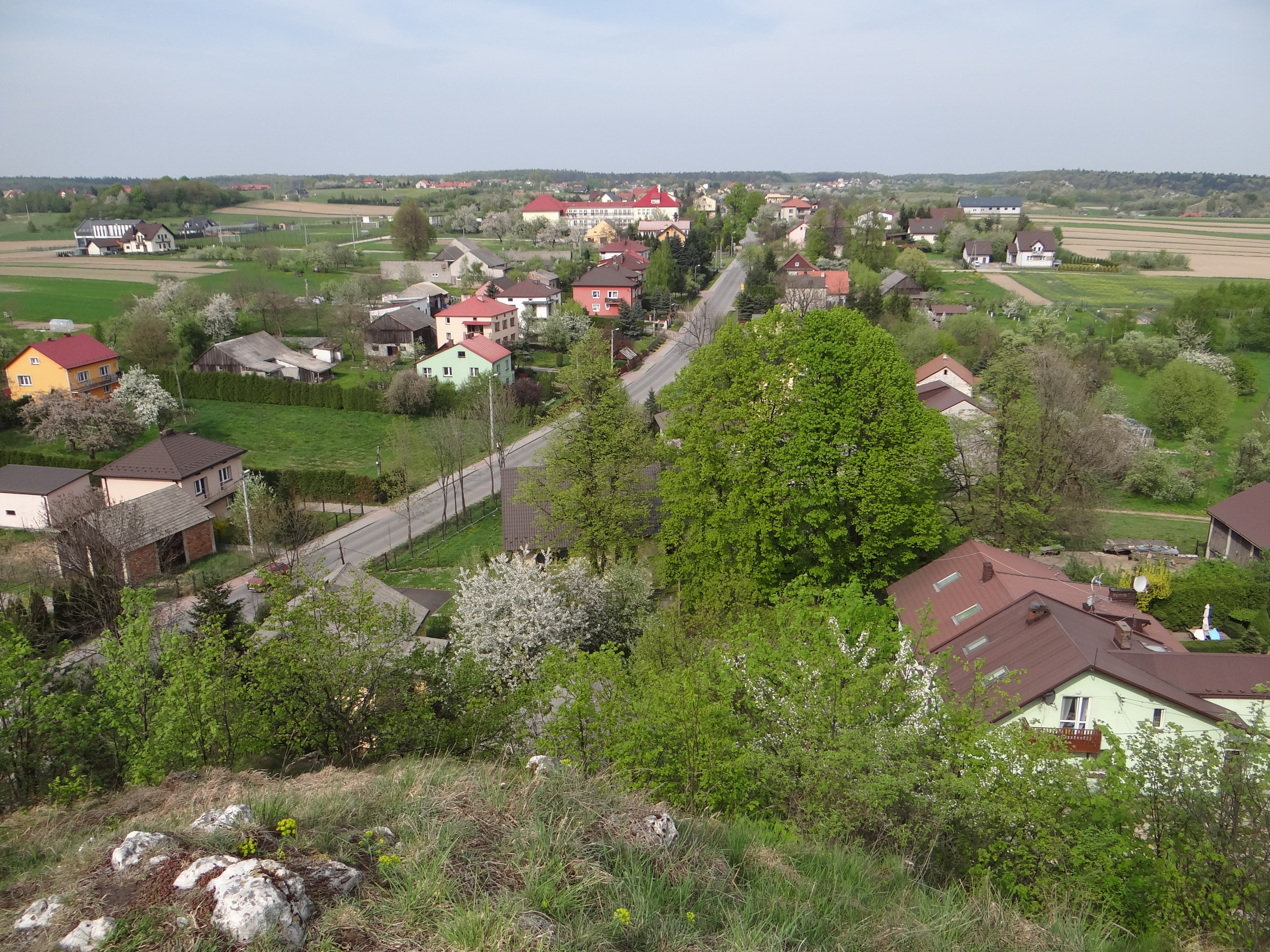

- Location within Poland
- Coordinates: 50°11′N 19°47′E
- Country: Poland
- Voivodeship: Lesser Poland
- County: Kraków
- Gmina: Wielka Wieś
- Population: 1,015
- Website: https://web.archive.org/web/20080918032232/http://beblo.przyolkuskiej.pl/

Bębło [ˈbɛmbwɔ] is a village in the administrative district of Gmina Wielka Wieś, within Kraków County, Lesser Poland Voivodeship, in southern Poland.
