= Giebułtów, Kraków County =

Giebułtów
- Village
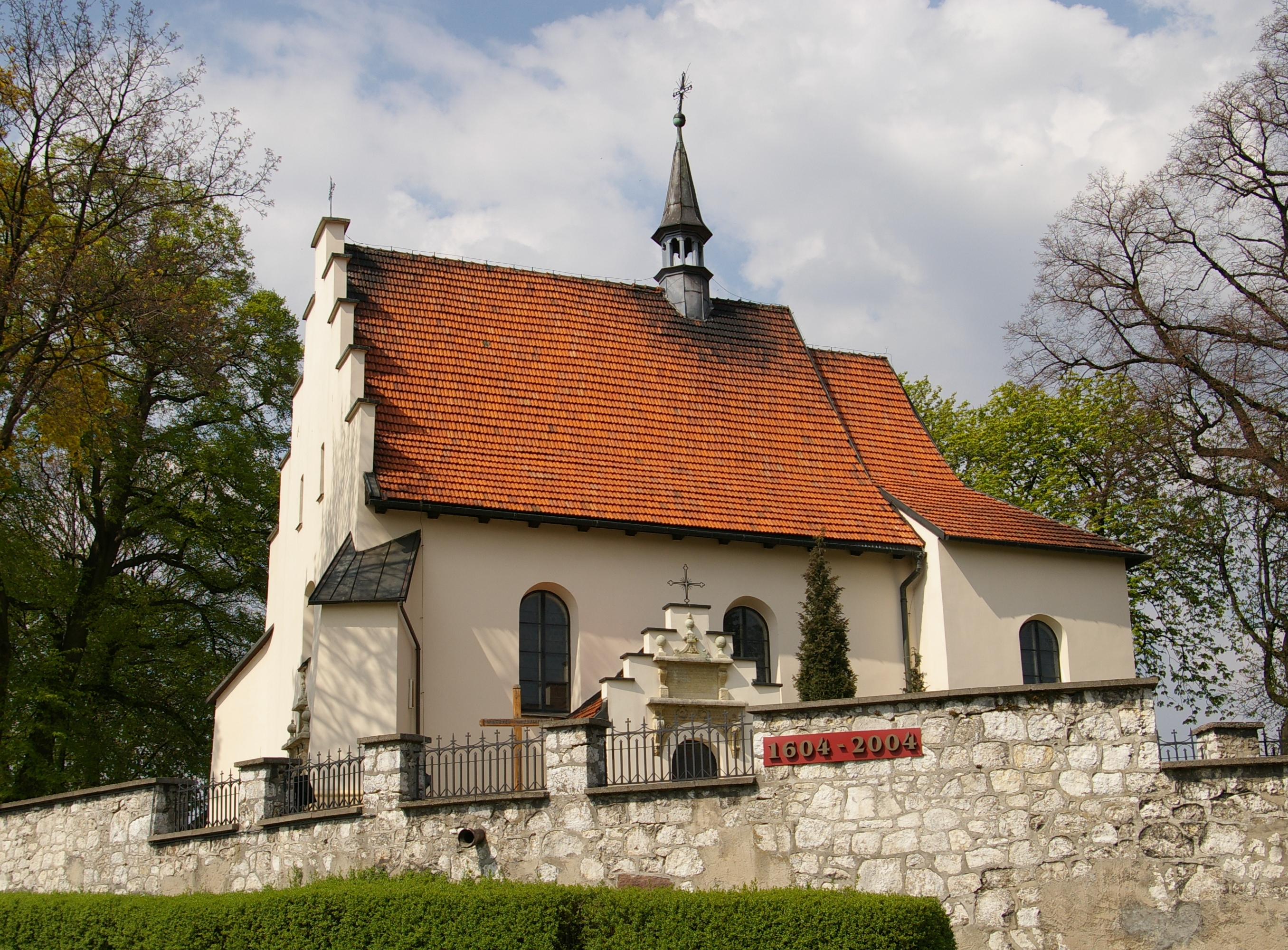
- Church of Saint Giles

- Location within Poland
- Coordinates: 50°8′30″N 19°53′1″E
- Country: Poland
- Voivodeship: Lesser Poland
- County: Kraków
- Gmina: Wielka Wieś

Giebułtów [ɡʲɛˈbuu̯tuf] is a village in the administrative district of Gmina Wielka Wieś, within Kraków County, Lesser Poland Voivodeship, in southern Poland. The village is located in the historical region Galicia.
