= Rzędowice, Miechów County =

Rzędowice
- Village
- Location within Poland
- Coordinates: 50°26′23″N 20°5′26″E
- Country: Poland
- Voivodeship: Lesser Poland
- County: Miechów
- Gmina: Książ Wielki
- Population: 410

Rzędowice [ʐɛndɔˈvit͡sɛ] is a village in the administrative district of Gmina Książ Wielki, within Miechów County, Lesser Poland Voivodeship, in southern Poland.
