= Wielka Wola =

Wielka Wola may refer to the following places in Poland:

- Wielka Wola, former village, now incorporated into Warsaw as the district of Wola
- Wielka Wola, Opoczno County in Łódź Voivodeship (central Poland)
- Wielka Wola, Gmina Czerniewice, Tomaszów County in Łódź Voivodeship (central Poland)
