= Szyce, Lesser Poland Voivodeship =

Szyce
- Village
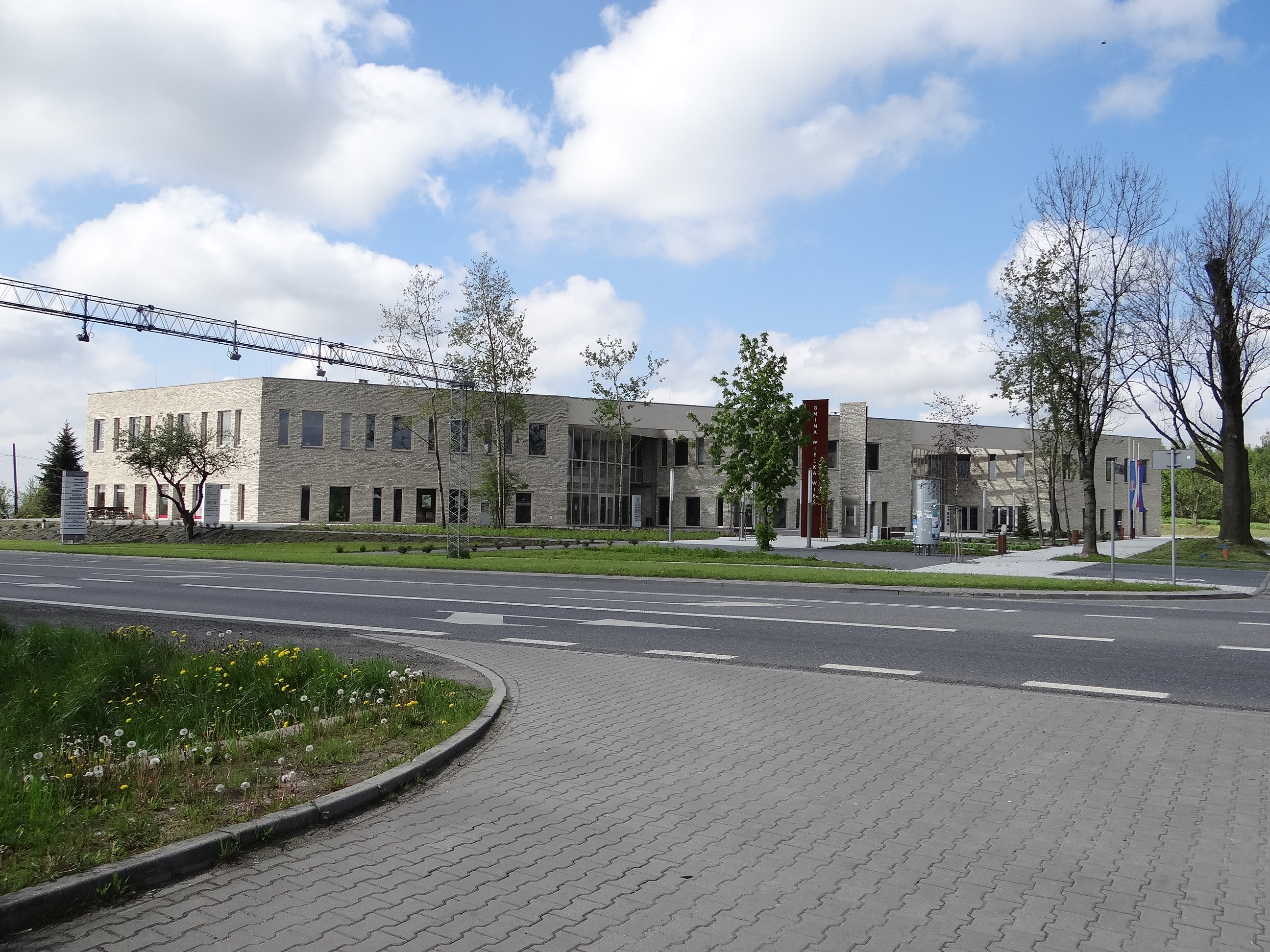

- Location within Poland
- Coordinates: 50°31′20″N 19°40′36″E
- Country: Poland
- Voivodeship: Lesser Poland
- County: Kraków
- Gmina: Wielka Wieś
- Time zone: UTC+1 (CET)
  - Summer (DST): UTC+2 (CEST)
- Vehicle registration: KRA
- Primary airports: Kraków John Paul II International Airport

Szyce [ˈʂɨt͡sɛ] is a village in the administrative district of Gmina Wielka Wieś, within Kraków County, Lesser Poland Voivodeship, in southern Poland.

== History ==
In 1234, Duke Bolesław V the Chaste from the Piast dynasty granted the village to a man named Klemens, who then passed it to his wife Racława. By 1238 it passed to the monastery in Staniątki.

Following the Partitions of Poland, from 1815, it was located in the Russian Partition of Poland. In 1827 Szyce had a population of 82. During the January Uprising, on 4 February and 7 May 1863, battles between Polish insurgents and Russian troops took place in Szyce.

Following World War I, Poland regained independence and control of the village. In 1924 the second Polish folk high school was established in Szyce.
