= Będkowice, Lesser Poland Voivodeship =

Będkowice
- Village
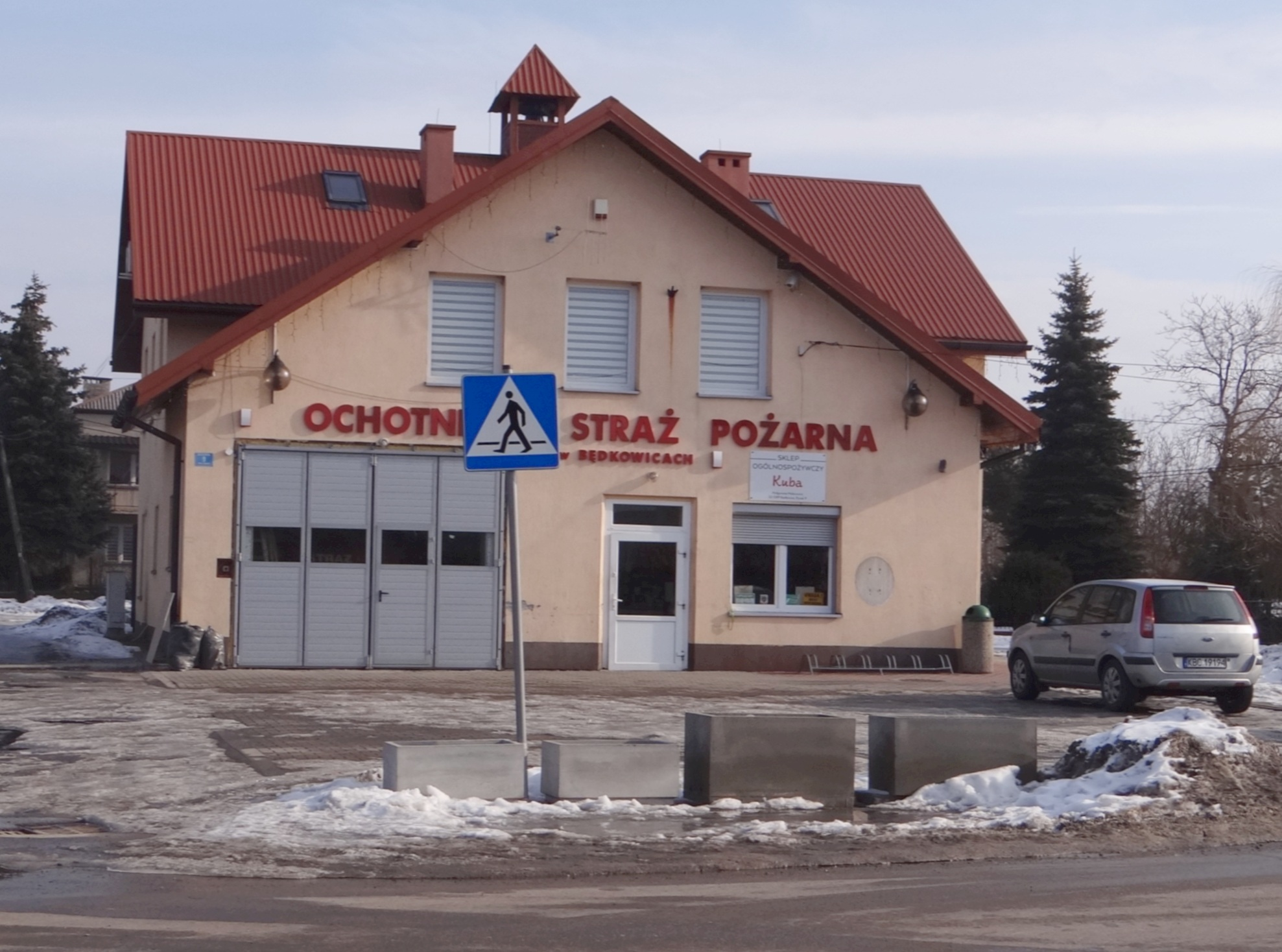
- Fire station

- Location within Poland
- Coordinates: 50°10′3″N 19°45′8″E
- Country: Poland
- Voivodeship: Lesser Poland
- County: Kraków
- Gmina: Wielka Wieś
- Elevation: 408 m (1,339 ft)

Będkowice [bɛntkɔˈvit͡sɛ] is a village in the administrative district of Gmina Wielka Wieś, within Kraków County, Lesser Poland Voivodeship, in southern Poland.
