= Cisie, Lesser Poland Voivodeship =

Village in southern Poland

Cisie
- Village
- Location within Poland
- Coordinates: 50°24′43″N 20°4′31″E
- Country: Poland
- Voivodeship: Lesser Poland
- County: Miechów
- Gmina: Książ Wielki

Cisie [ˈt͡ɕiɕɛ] is a village in the administrative district of Gmina Książ Wielki, within Miechów County, Lesser Poland Voivodeship, in southern Poland.
