= Mostek (disambiguation) =

Mostek was a manufacturer of integrated circuits.

Mostek may also refer to places:

== Czech Republic ==
- Mostek (Trutnov District), a municipality and village in the Hradec Králové Region
- Mostek (Ústí nad Orlicí District), a municipality and village in the Pardubice Region
- Mostek, a village and part of Dolní Hrachovice in the South Bohemian Region
- Mostek, an extinct village and part of Rybník (Domažlice District) in the Plzeň Region

== Poland ==
- Mostek, Lesser Poland Voivodeship, a village in southern Poland
- Mostek, Podlaskie Voivodeship, a village in north-eastern Poland
- Mostek, Warmian-Masurian Voivodeship, a settlement in northern Poland

== See also ==
- MOS Technology
