= Przybysławice =

Przybysławice may refer to the following places:

- Przybysławice, Gmina Skała in Lesser Poland Voivodeship (south Poland)
- Przybysławice, Gmina Zielonki in Lesser Poland Voivodeship (south Poland)
- Przybysławice, Lublin Voivodeship (east Poland)
- Przybysławice, Gmina Gołcza in Lesser Poland Voivodeship (south Poland)
- Przybysławice, Gmina Kozłów in Lesser Poland Voivodeship (south Poland)
- Przybysławice, Proszowice County in Lesser Poland Voivodeship (south Poland)
- Przybysławice, Opatów County in Świętokrzyskie Voivodeship (south-central Poland)
- Przybysławice, Sandomierz County in Świętokrzyskie Voivodeship (south-central Poland)
- Przybysławice, Tarnów County in Lesser Poland Voivodeship (south Poland)
- Przybysławice, Greater Poland Voivodeship (west-central Poland)
