= Janowiczki =

Janowiczki may refer to the following places in Poland:

- Janowiczki, Lower Silesian Voivodeship (south-west Poland)
- Janowiczki, Lesser Poland Voivodeship (south Poland)
- Janowiczki, Pomeranian Voivodeship (north Poland)
