= Kalina-Lisiniec =

- Village
- Location within Poland
- Coordinates: 50°20′59″N 20°7′53″E
- Country: Poland
- Voivodeship: Lesser Poland
- County: Miechów
- Gmina: Miechów
- Population: 230

Kalina-Lisiniec [kaˈlina liˈɕiɲɛt͡s] is a village in the administrative district of Gmina Miechów, within Miechów County, Lesser Poland Voivodeship, in southern Poland.
