= Krępa, Lesser Poland Voivodeship =

Krępa
- Village
- Location within Poland
- Coordinates: 50°19′43″N 19°57′12″E
- Country: Poland
- Voivodeship: Lesser Poland
- County: Miechów
- Gmina: Gołcza
- Population: 353

Krępa [ˈkrɛmpa] is a village in the administrative district of Gmina Gołcza, within Miechów County, Lesser Poland Voivodeship, in southern Poland.
