= Dosłońce =

- Village
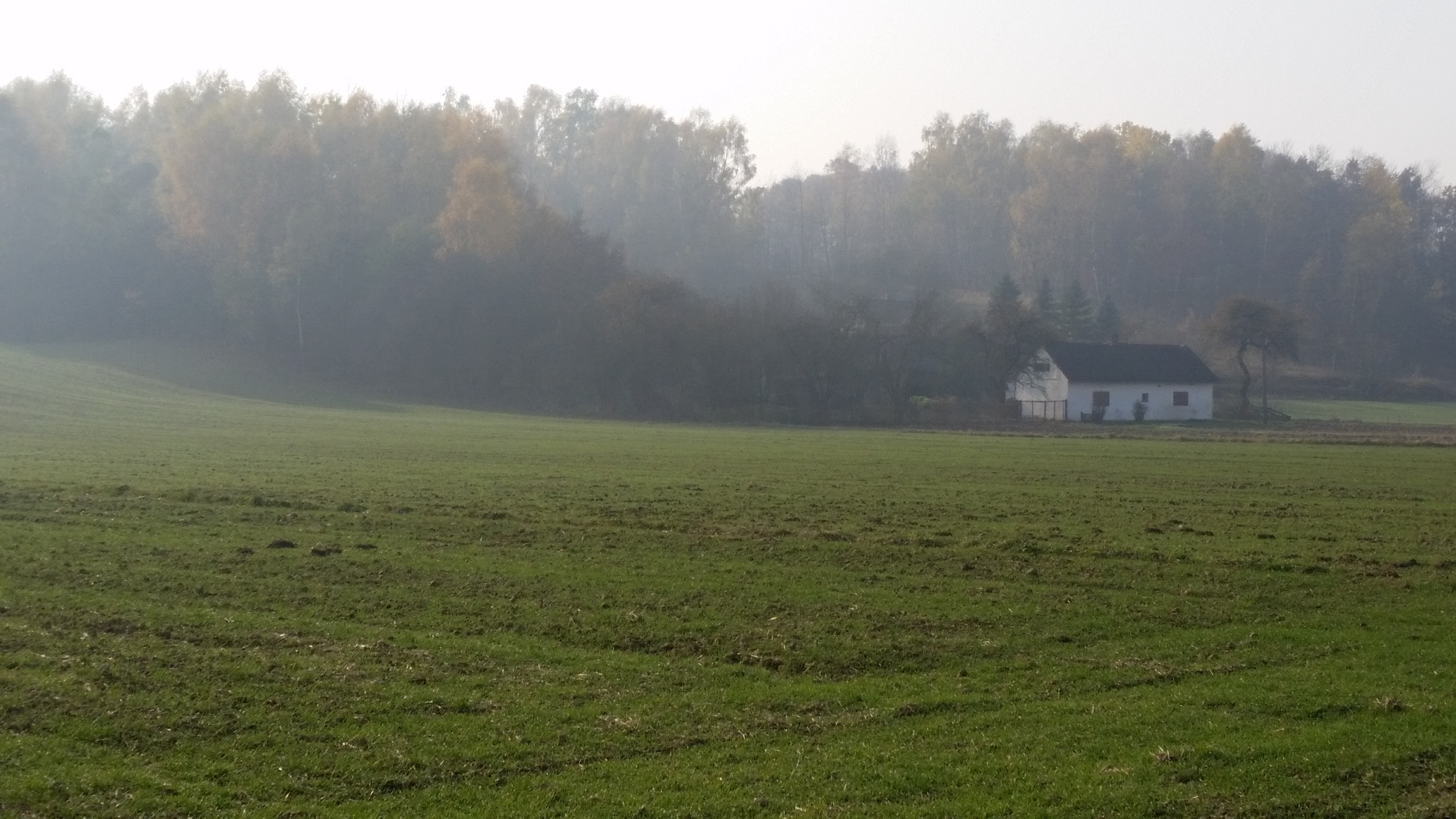

- Location within Poland
- Coordinates: 50°20′47″N 20°13′34″E
- Country: Poland
- Voivodeship: Lesser Poland
- County: Miechów
- Gmina: Racławice
- Population: 80

Dosłońce [dɔˈswɔɲt͡sɛ] is a village in the administrative district of Gmina Racławice, within Miechów County, Lesser Poland Voivodeship, in southern Poland.
