= Laski Dworskie =

- Village
- Location within Poland
- Coordinates: 50°16′2″N 19°55′48″E
- Country: Poland
- Voivodeship: Lesser Poland
- County: Miechów
- Gmina: Gołcza
- Population: 137

Laski Dworskie (Polish pronunciation: [ˈlaskʲi ˈdvɔrskʲɛ]) is a village in the administrative district of Gmina Gołcza, within Miechów County, Lesser Poland Voivodeship, in southern Poland.
