= Przesławice, Miechów County =

Przesławice
- Village
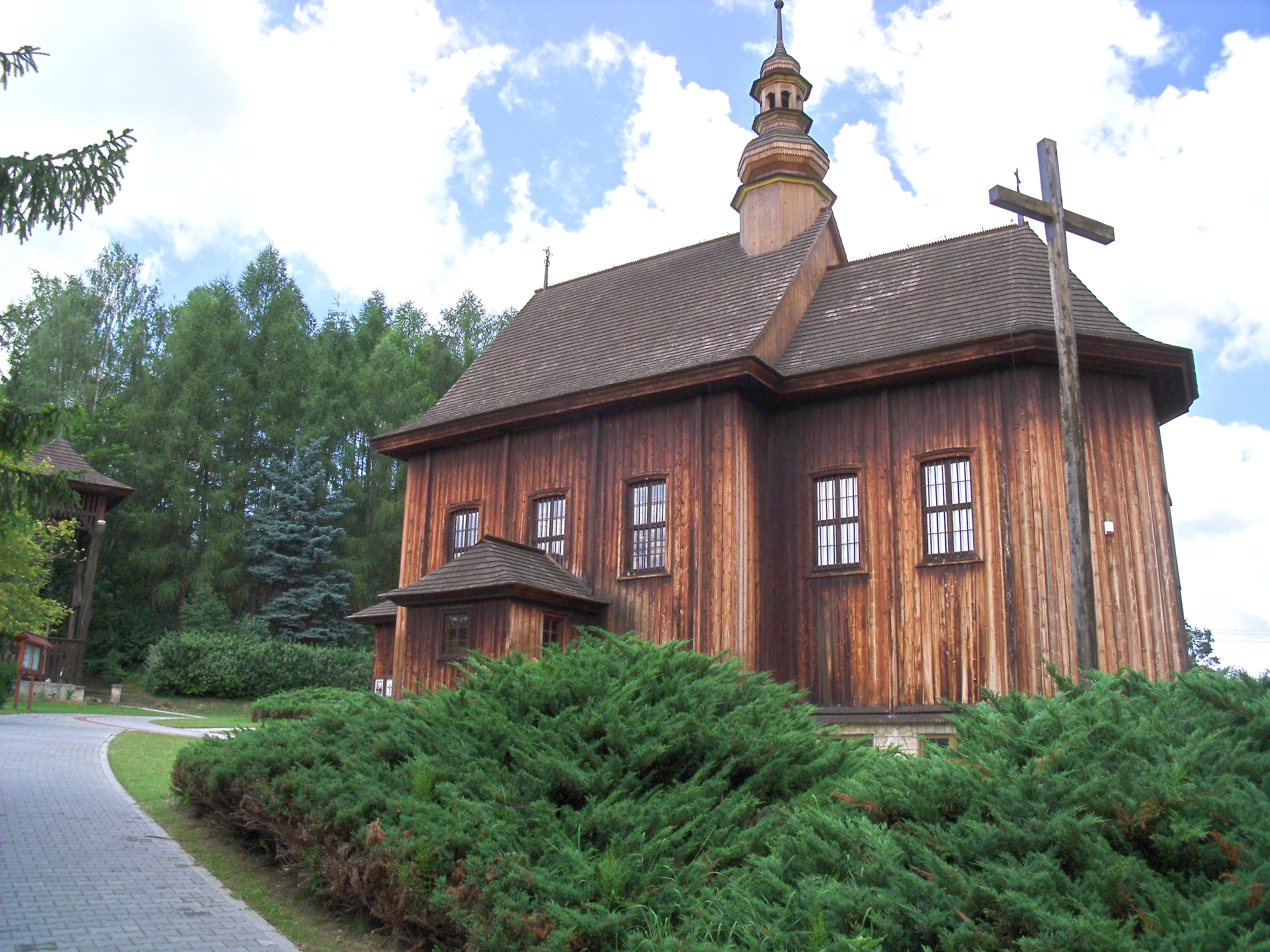
- Catholic church

- Location within Poland
- Coordinates: 50°18′55″N 20°0′32″E
- Country: Poland
- Voivodeship: Lesser Poland
- County: Miechów
- Gmina: Miechów
- Population: 340

Przesławice [pʂɛswaˈvit͡sɛ] is a village in the administrative district of Gmina Miechów, within Miechów County, Lesser Poland Voivodeship, in southern Poland.
