= Wolica, Miechów County =

Wolica
- Village
- Location within Poland
- Coordinates: 50°29′3″N 20°5′27″E
- Country: Poland
- Voivodeship: Lesser Poland
- County: Miechów
- Gmina: Kozłów
- Population: 340

Wolica [vɔˈlit͡sa] is a village in the administrative district of Gmina Kozłów, within Miechów County, Lesser Poland Voivodeship, in southern Poland.
