= Wielki Dół =

- Village
- Location within Poland
- Coordinates: 50°19′1″N 20°1′52″E
- Country: Poland
- Voivodeship: Lesser Poland
- County: Miechów
- Gmina: Miechów
- Population: 130

Wielki Dół (Polish pronunciation: [ˈvjɛlkʲi ˈduw]) is a village in the administrative district of Gmina Miechów, within Miechów County, Lesser Poland Voivodeship, in southern Poland.
