= Ulina Wielka =

- Village
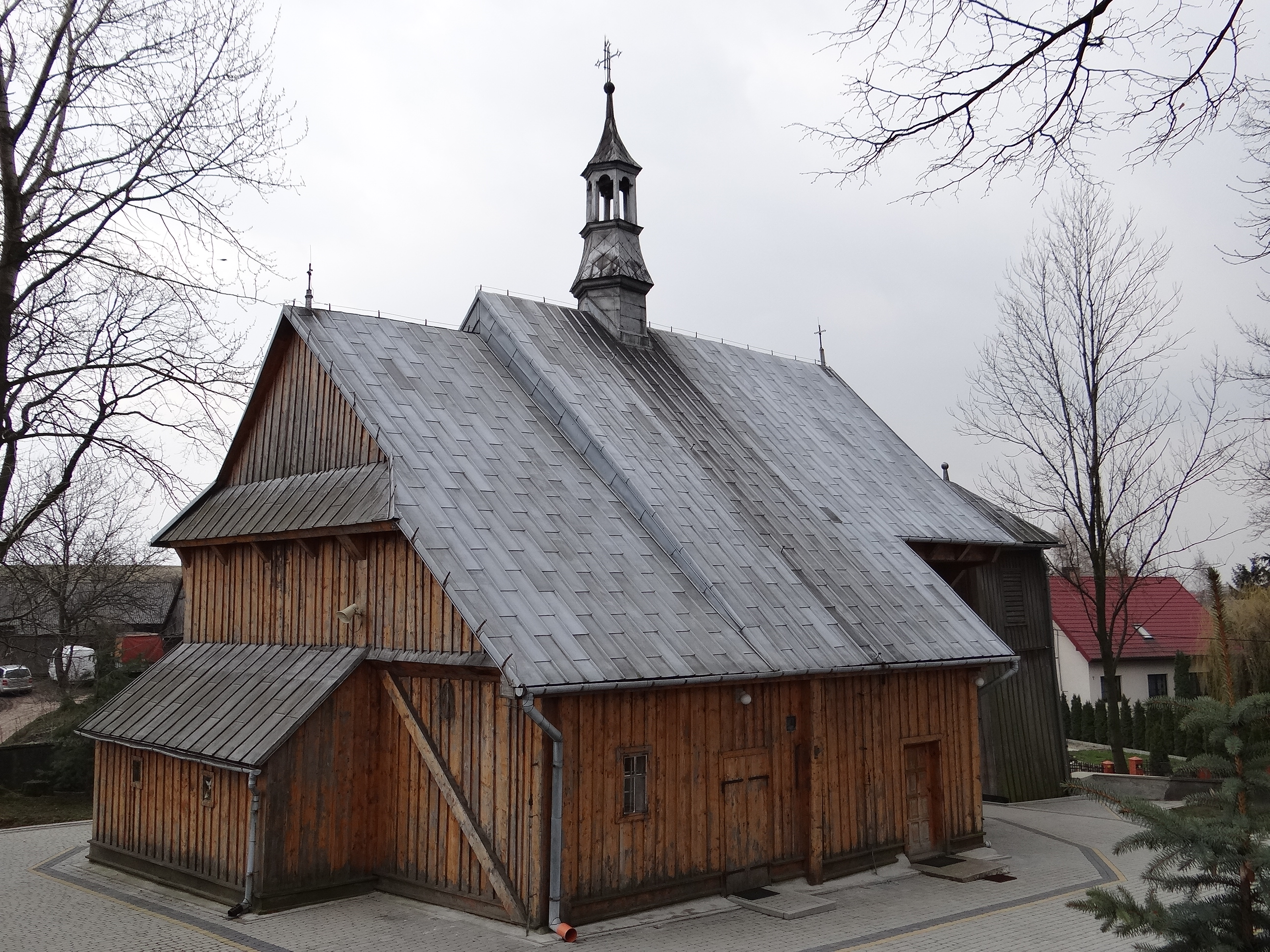
- Catholic church

- Location within Poland
- Coordinates: 50°19′18″N 19°53′20″E
- Country: Poland
- Voivodeship: Lesser Poland
- County: Miechów
- Gmina: Gołcza
- Population: 312

Ulina Wielka [uˈlina ˈvjɛlka] is a village in the administrative district of Gmina Gołcza, within Miechów County, Lesser Poland Voivodeship, in southern Poland.
