= Podmiejska Wola =

- Village
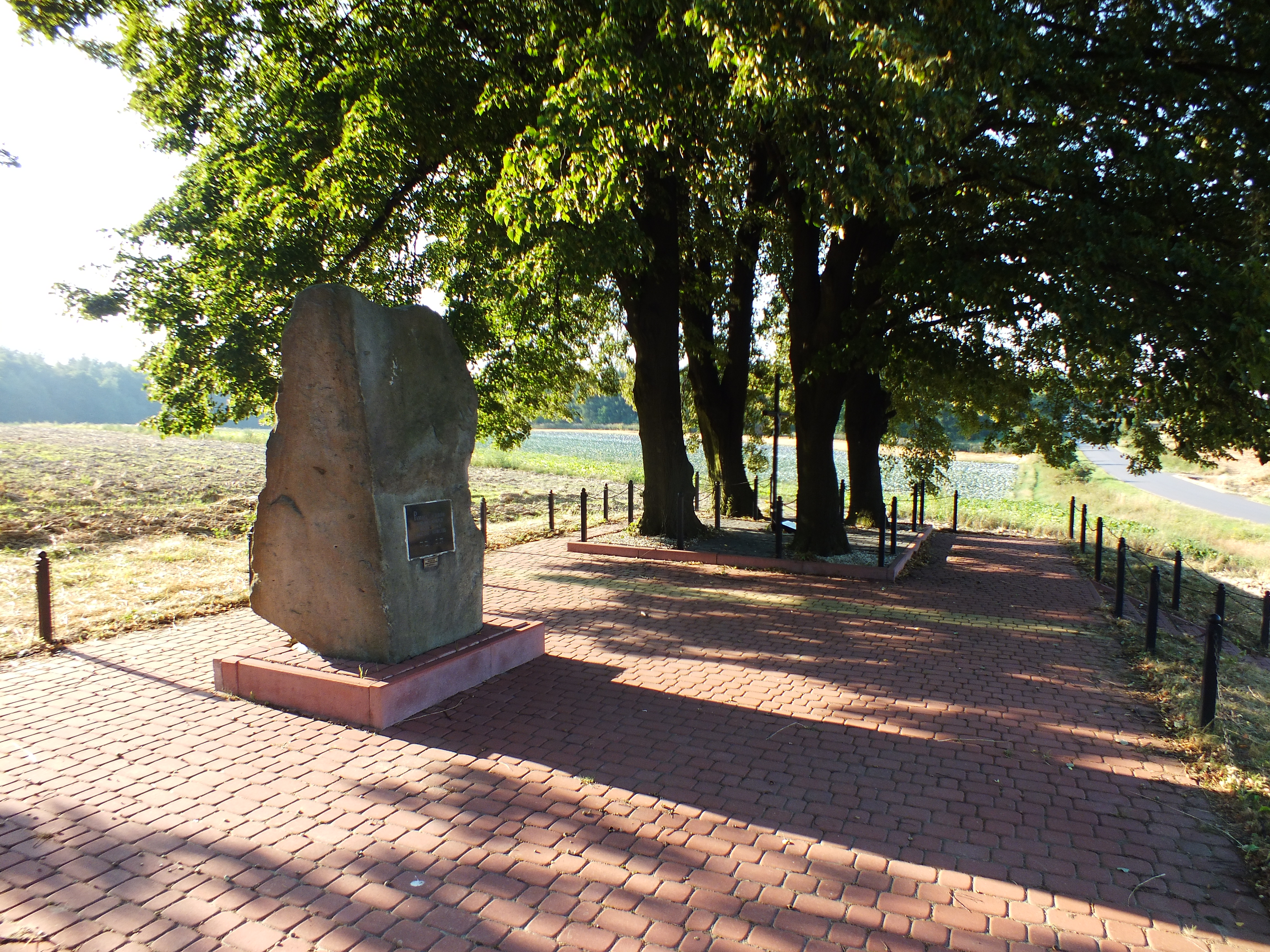
- Holocaust monument

- Location within Poland
- Coordinates: 50°22′3″N 19°59′6″E
- Country: Poland
- Voivodeship: Lesser Poland
- County: Miechów
- Gmina: Miechów

Podmiejska Wola [pɔdˈmjɛi̯ska ˈvɔla] is a village in the administrative district of Gmina Miechów, within Miechów County, Lesser Poland Voivodeship, in southern Poland.
