= Pstroszyce Drugie =

- Village
- Location within Poland
- Coordinates: 50°24′33″N 19°59′9″E
- Country: Poland
- Voivodeship: Lesser Poland
- County: Miechów
- Gmina: Miechów

Pstroszyce Drugie [pstrɔˈʂɨt͡sɛ ˈdruɡʲɛ] is a village in the administrative district of Gmina Miechów, within Miechów County, Lesser Poland Voivodeship, in southern Poland.
