= Kamieńczyce, Lesser Poland Voivodeship =

Kamieńczyce
- Village
- Location within Poland
- Coordinates: 50°20′7″N 20°0′11″E
- Country: Poland
- Voivodeship: Lesser Poland
- County: Miechów
- Gmina: Miechów
- Population: 80

Kamieńczyce [kamjɛɲˈt͡ʂɨt͡sɛ] is a village in the administrative district of Gmina Miechów, within Miechów County, Lesser Poland Voivodeship, in southern Poland.
