= Zarogów =

- Village
- Location within Poland
- Coordinates: 50°20′22″N 20°6′41″E
- Country: Poland
- Voivodeship: Lesser Poland
- County: Miechów
- Gmina: Miechów
- Population: 380

Zarogów [zaˈrɔɡuf] is a village in the administrative district of Gmina Miechów, within Miechów County, Lesser Poland Voivodeship, in southern Poland.
