= Pojałowice =

- Village
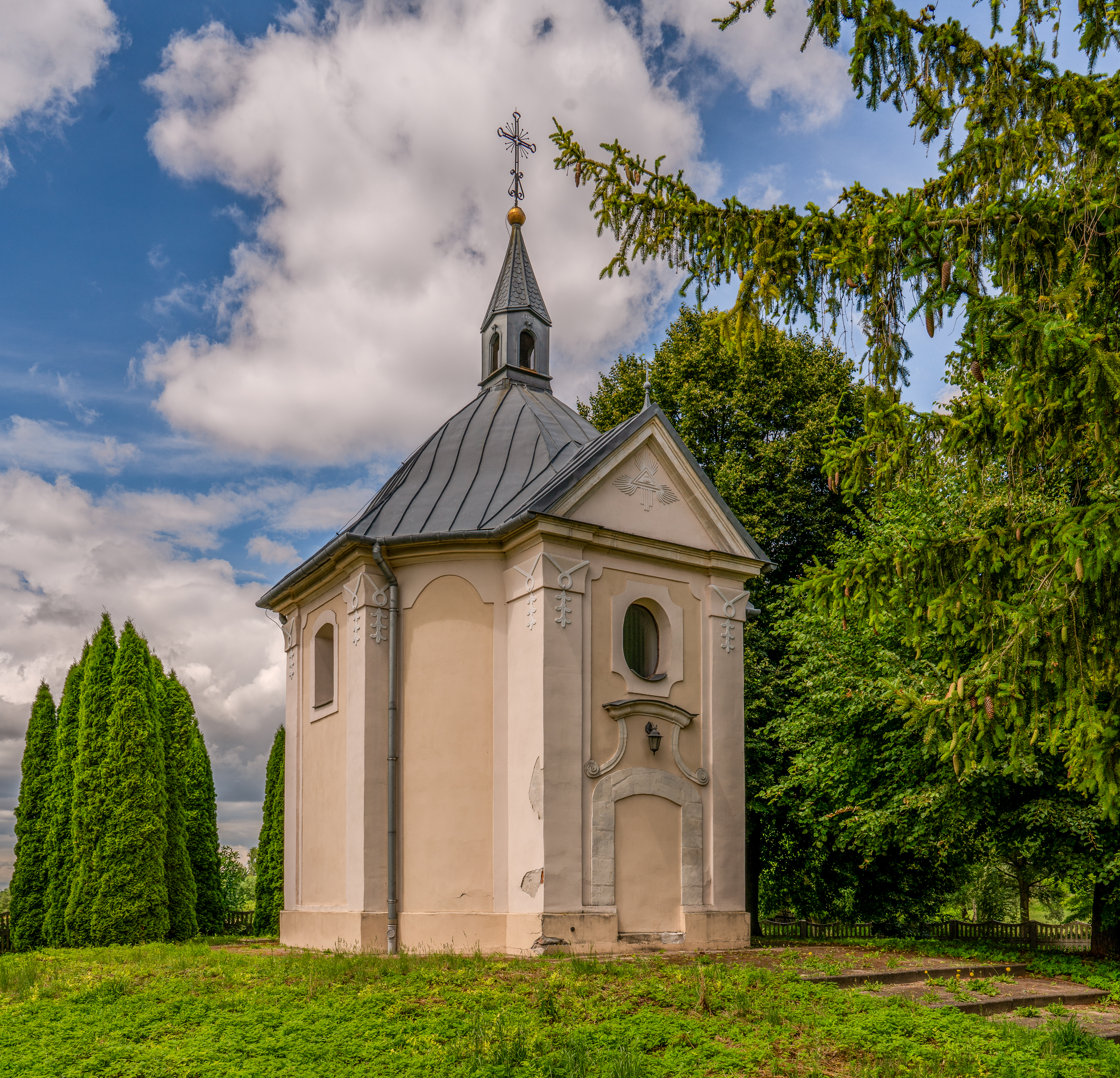
- Chapel

- Location within Poland
- Coordinates: 50°19′10″N 20°6′4″E
- Country: Poland
- Voivodeship: Lesser Poland
- County: Miechów
- Gmina: Miechów
- Population: 330

Pojałowice [pɔjawɔˈvit͡sɛ] is a village in the administrative district of Gmina Miechów, within Miechów County, Lesser Poland Voivodeship, in southern Poland.
