= Brzuchania =

- Village
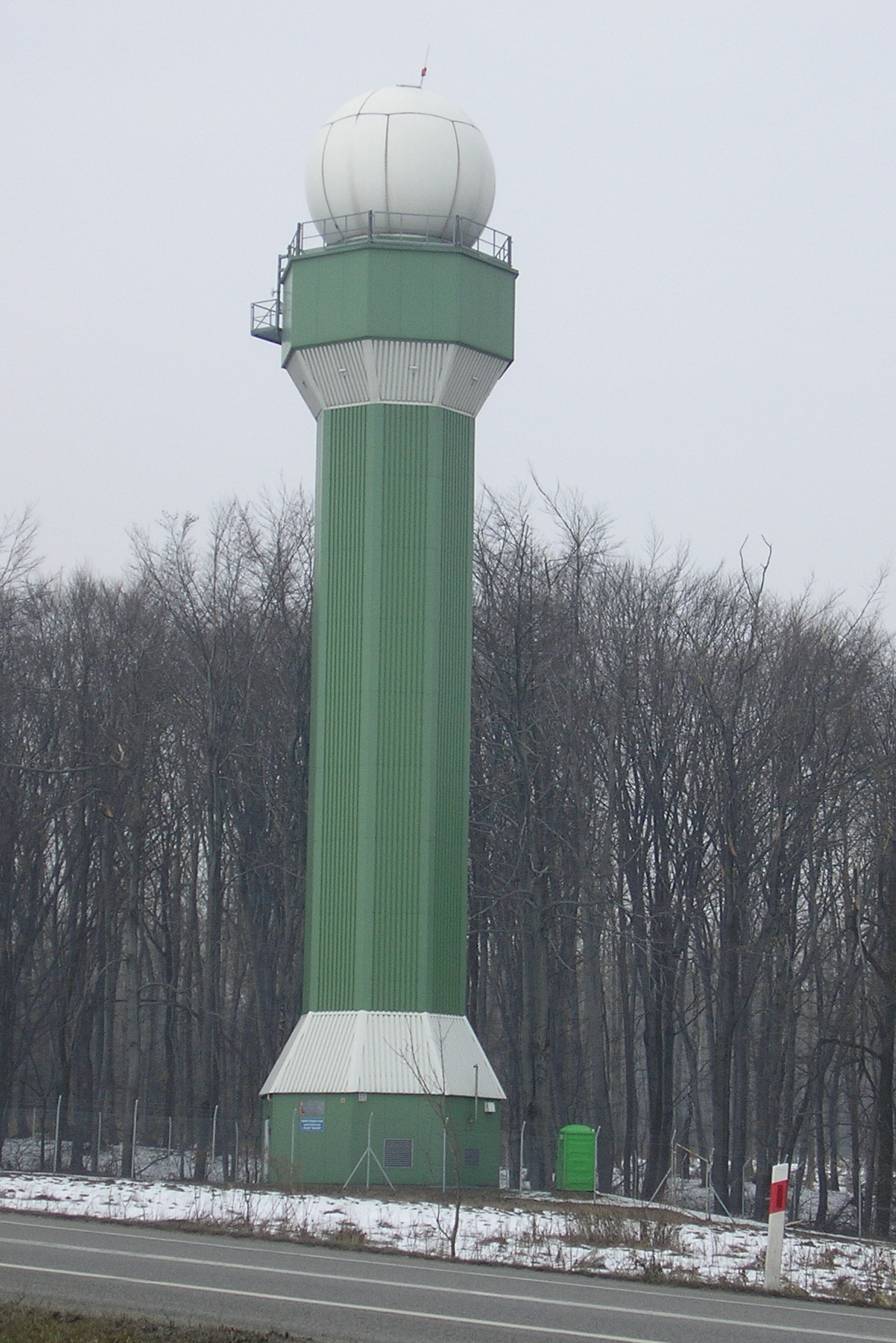
- Weather radar

- Location within Poland
- Coordinates: 50°23′10″N 20°5′41″E
- Country: Poland
- Voivodeship: Lesser Poland
- County: Miechów
- Gmina: Miechów
- Population: 330

Brzuchania [bʐuˈxaɲa] is a village in the administrative district of Gmina Miechów, within Miechów County, Lesser Poland Voivodeship, in southern Poland.
