= Góry Miechowskie =

- Village
- Location within Poland
- Coordinates: 50°21′35″N 20°10′48″E
- Country: Poland
- Voivodeship: Lesser Poland
- County: Miechów
- Gmina: Racławice
- Population: 28

Góry Miechowskie [ˈɡurɨ mjɛˈxɔfskʲɛ] is a village in the administrative district of Gmina Racławice, within Miechów County, Lesser Poland Voivodeship, in southern Poland.
