= Czaple Małe =

- Village
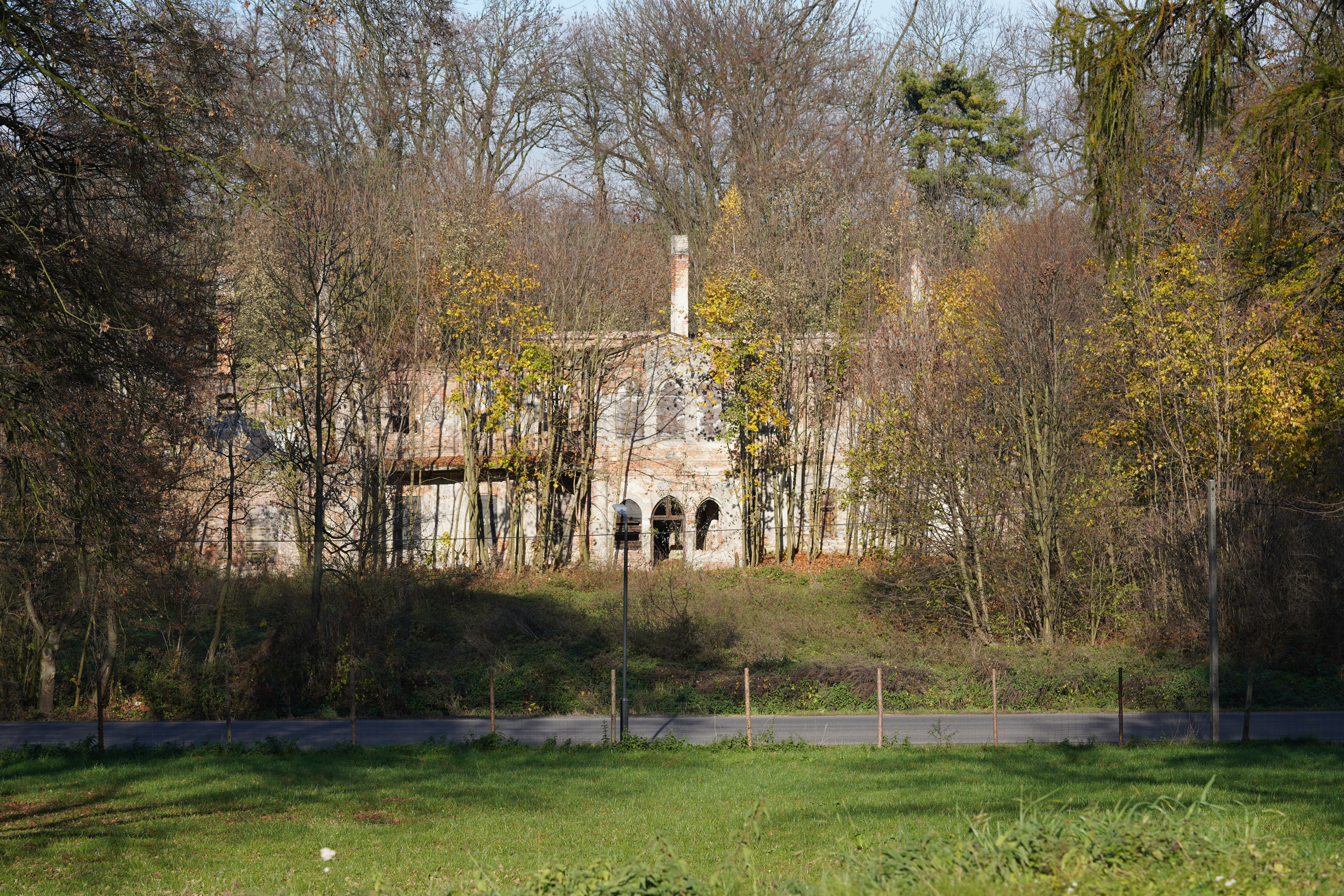
- Manor house

- Location within Poland
- Coordinates: 50°17′56″N 19°57′5″E
- Country: Poland
- Voivodeship: Lesser Poland
- County: Miechów
- Gmina: Gołcza

Czaple Małe [ˈt͡ʂaplɛ ˈmawɛ] is a village in the administrative district of Gmina Gołcza, within Miechów County, Lesser Poland Voivodeship, in southern Poland.
