= Wierzbica, Miechów County =

Wierzbica
- Village
- Location within Poland
- Coordinates: 50°30′1″N 20°3′31″E
- Country: Poland
- Voivodeship: Lesser Poland
- County: Miechów
- Gmina: Kozłów
- Population: 270

Wierzbica [vjɛʐˈbit͡sa] is a village in the administrative district of Gmina Kozłów, within Miechów County, Lesser Poland Voivodeship, in southern Poland.
