= Poradów =

Poradów may refer to the following places in Poland:

- Poradów, Lower Silesian Voivodeship (south-west Poland)
- Poradów, Lesser Poland Voivodeship (south Poland)
