= Szczepanowice, Miechów County =

Szczepanowice
- Village
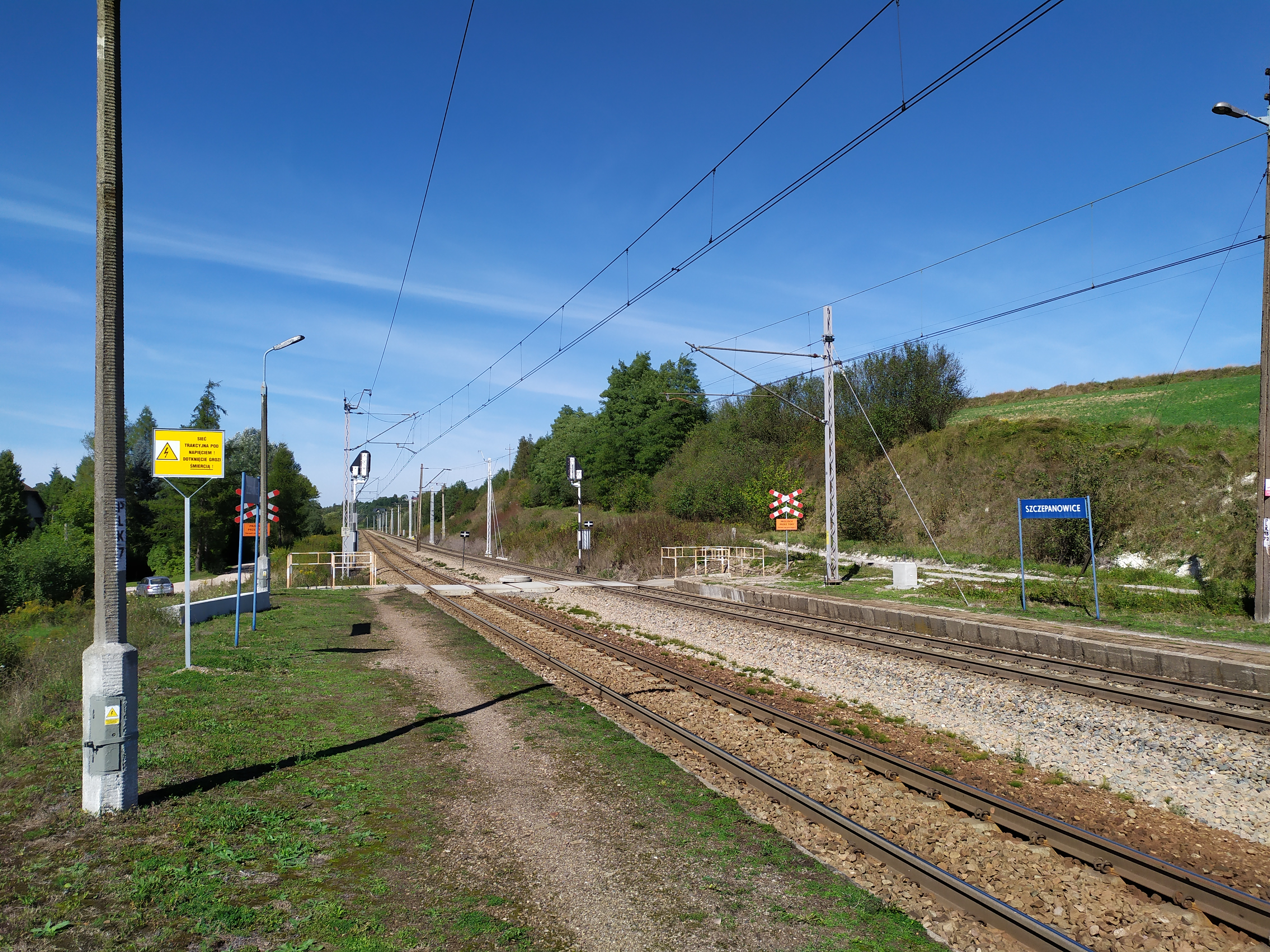
- Railway station

- Location within Poland
- Coordinates: 50°17′56″N 20°2′41″E
- Country: Poland
- Voivodeship: Lesser Poland
- County: Miechów
- Gmina: Miechów
- Population: 460

Szczepanowice [ʂt͡ʂɛpanɔˈvit͡sɛ] is a village in the administrative district of Gmina Miechów, within Miechów County, Lesser Poland Voivodeship, in southern Poland.
