= Zapustka =

- Village
- Location within Poland
- Coordinates: 50°23′28″N 20°3′34″E
- Country: Poland
- Voivodeship: Lesser Poland
- County: Miechów
- Gmina: Miechów

Zapustka (Polish pronunciation: [zaˈpustka]) is a village in the administrative district of Gmina Miechów, within Miechów County, Lesser Poland Voivodeship, in southern Poland.
