= Adamowice, Lesser Poland Voivodeship =

Adamowice
- Village
- Location within Poland
- Coordinates: 50°22′46″N 19°50′29″E
- Country: Poland
- Voivodeship: Lesser Poland
- County: Miechów
- Gmina: Gołcza
- Population: 95

Adamowice [adamɔˈvit͡sɛ] is a village in the administrative district of Gmina Gołcza, within Miechów County, Lesser Poland Voivodeship, in southern Poland.
