= Zagorzyce, Lesser Poland Voivodeship =

Zagorzyce
- Village
- Location within Poland
- Coordinates: 50°22′49″N 19°59′59″E
- Country: Poland
- Voivodeship: Lesser Poland
- County: Miechów
- Gmina: Miechów
- Population: 260

Zagorzyce [zaɡɔˈʐɨt͡sɛ] is a village in the administrative district of Gmina Miechów, within Miechów County, Lesser Poland Voivodeship, in southern Poland.
