= Falniów =

- Village
- Location within Poland
- Coordinates: 50°21′39″N 19°58′15″E
- Country: Poland
- Voivodeship: Lesser Poland
- County: Miechów
- Gmina: Miechów
- Population: 340

Falniów [ˈfalɲuf] is a village in the administrative district of Gmina Miechów, within Miechów County, Lesser Poland Voivodeship, in southern Poland.
