= Klonów, Lesser Poland Voivodeship =

Klonów
- Village
- Location within Poland
- Coordinates: 50°20′7″N 20°10′59″E
- Country: Poland
- Voivodeship: Lesser Poland
- County: Miechów
- Gmina: Racławice
- Population (approx.): 390

Klonów [ˈklɔnuf] is a village in the administrative district of Gmina Racławice, within Miechów County, Lesser Poland Voivodeship, in southern Poland.

The village has an approximate population of 390.
