= Strzeżów Drugi =

- Village
- Location within Poland
- Coordinates: 50°23′11″N 20°2′45″E
- Country: Poland
- Voivodeship: Lesser Poland
- County: Miechów
- Gmina: Miechów
- Population: 220

Strzeżów Drugi [ˈstʂɛʐuf ˈdruɡi] is a village in the administrative district of Gmina Miechów, within Miechów County, Lesser Poland Voivodeship, in southern Poland.
