= Kościejów =

- Village
- Location within Poland
- Coordinates: 50°19′47″N 20°16′34″E
- Country: Poland
- Voivodeship: Lesser Poland
- County: Miechów
- Gmina: Racławice
- Population: 420

Kościejów [kɔɕˈt͡ɕɛjuf] is a village in the administrative district of Gmina Racławice, within Miechów County, Lesser Poland Voivodeship, in southern Poland.
