= Maków =

Maków may refer to:

- Maków, Lesser Poland Voivodeship, south Poland
- Maków, Łódź Voivodeship, central Poland
- Maków, Masovian Voivodeship, east-central Poland
- Maków, Silesian Voivodeship, south Poland
- Maków, Warmian-Masurian Voivodeship, north Poland
- Maków County, a county in Masovian Voivodeship, east-central Poland
- Maków Mazowiecki, a town in Masovian Voivodeship, east-central Poland

== See also ==
- Maków-Kolonia, Łódź Voivodeship, central Poland
- Makov (disambiguation)
- Makowo (disambiguation)
