= Karczowice =

Karczowice may refer to the following places in Poland:

- Karczowice, Lower Silesian Voivodeship (south-west Poland)
- Karczowice, Lesser Poland Voivodeship (south Poland)
