= Szreniawa, Miechów County =

Szreniawa
- Village
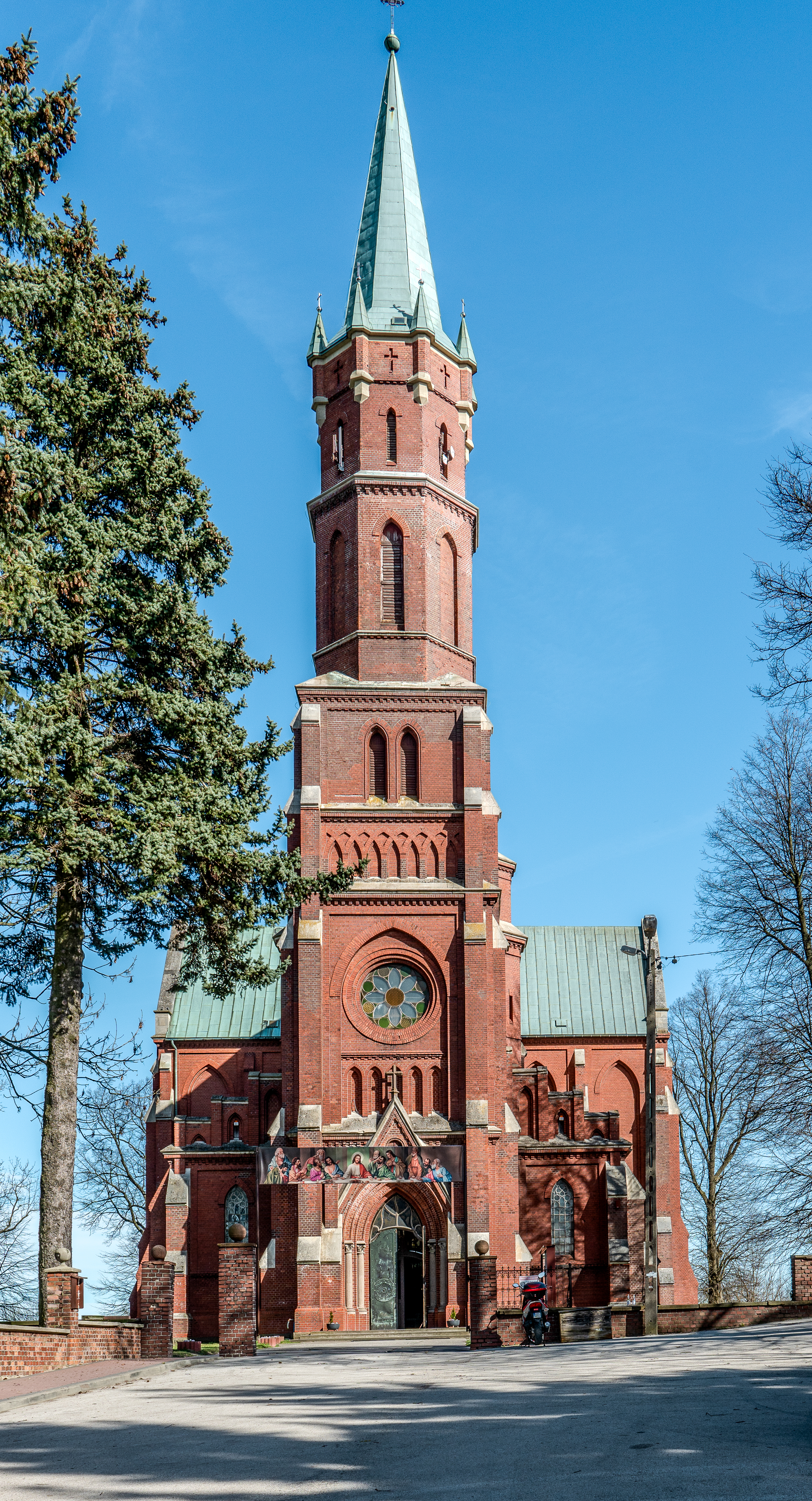
- Catholic church

- Location within Poland
- Coordinates: 50°22′13″N 19°51′52″E
- Country: Poland
- Voivodeship: Lesser Poland
- County: Miechów
- Gmina: Gołcza
- Population: 397

Szreniawa [ʂrɛˈɲava] is a village in the administrative district of Gmina Gołcza, within Miechów County, Lesser Poland Voivodeship, in southern Poland.
