= Buk, Lesser Poland Voivodeship =

Buk
- Village
- Location within Poland
- Coordinates: 50°20′29″N 19°51′54″E
- Country: Poland
- Voivodeship: Lesser Poland
- County: Miechów
- Gmina: Gołcza

Population
  - Total: 255
- Postal code: 32-075
- Vehicle registration: KMI

Buk [buk] is a village in the administrative district of Gmina Gołcza, within Miechów County, Lesser Poland Voivodeship, in southern Poland.
