= Biskupice, Miechów County =

Biskupice
- Village
- Location within Poland
- Coordinates: 50°20′52″N 19°59′30″E
- Country: Poland
- Voivodeship: Lesser Poland
- County: Miechów
- Gmina: Miechów
- Population: 400

Biskupice [biskuˈpit͡sɛ] is a village in the administrative district of Gmina Miechów, within Miechów County, Lesser Poland Voivodeship, in southern Poland.
