= Bogdanów, Lesser Poland Voivodeship =

Bogdanów
- Village
- Location within Poland
- Coordinates: 50°27′52″N 20°2′15″E
- Country: Poland
- Voivodeship: Lesser Poland
- County: Miechów
- Gmina: Kozłów
- Population: 120

Bogdanów [bɔɡˈdanuf] is a village in the administrative district of Gmina Kozłów, within Miechów County, Lesser Poland Voivodeship, in southern Poland.
