= Kalina-Rędziny =

- Village
- Location within Poland
- Coordinates: 50°21′11″N 20°6′32″E
- Country: Poland
- Voivodeship: Lesser Poland
- County: Miechów
- Gmina: Miechów
- Population: 210

Kalina-Rędziny [kaˈlina rɛnˈd͡ʑinɨ] is a village in the administrative district of Gmina Miechów, within Miechów County, Lesser Poland Voivodeship, in southern Poland.
