= Zawadka, Miechów County =

Zawadka
- Village
- Location within Poland
- Coordinates: 50°19′30″N 19°50′55″E
- Country: Poland
- Voivodeship: Lesser Poland
- County: Miechów
- Gmina: Gołcza
- Population: 64

Zawadka [zaˈvatka] is a village in the administrative district of Gmina Gołcza, within Miechów County, Lesser Poland Voivodeship, in southern Poland.
