= Widnica =

- Village
- Location within Poland
- Coordinates: 50°23′57″N 20°01′53″E
- Country: Poland
- Voivodeship: Lesser Poland
- County: Miechów
- Gmina: Miechów

Widnica is a village in the administrative district of Gmina Miechów, within Miechów County, Lesser Poland Voivodeship, in southern Poland.

In 2011, it had a population of 146.
