= Jaksice, Miechów County =

Jaksice
- Village
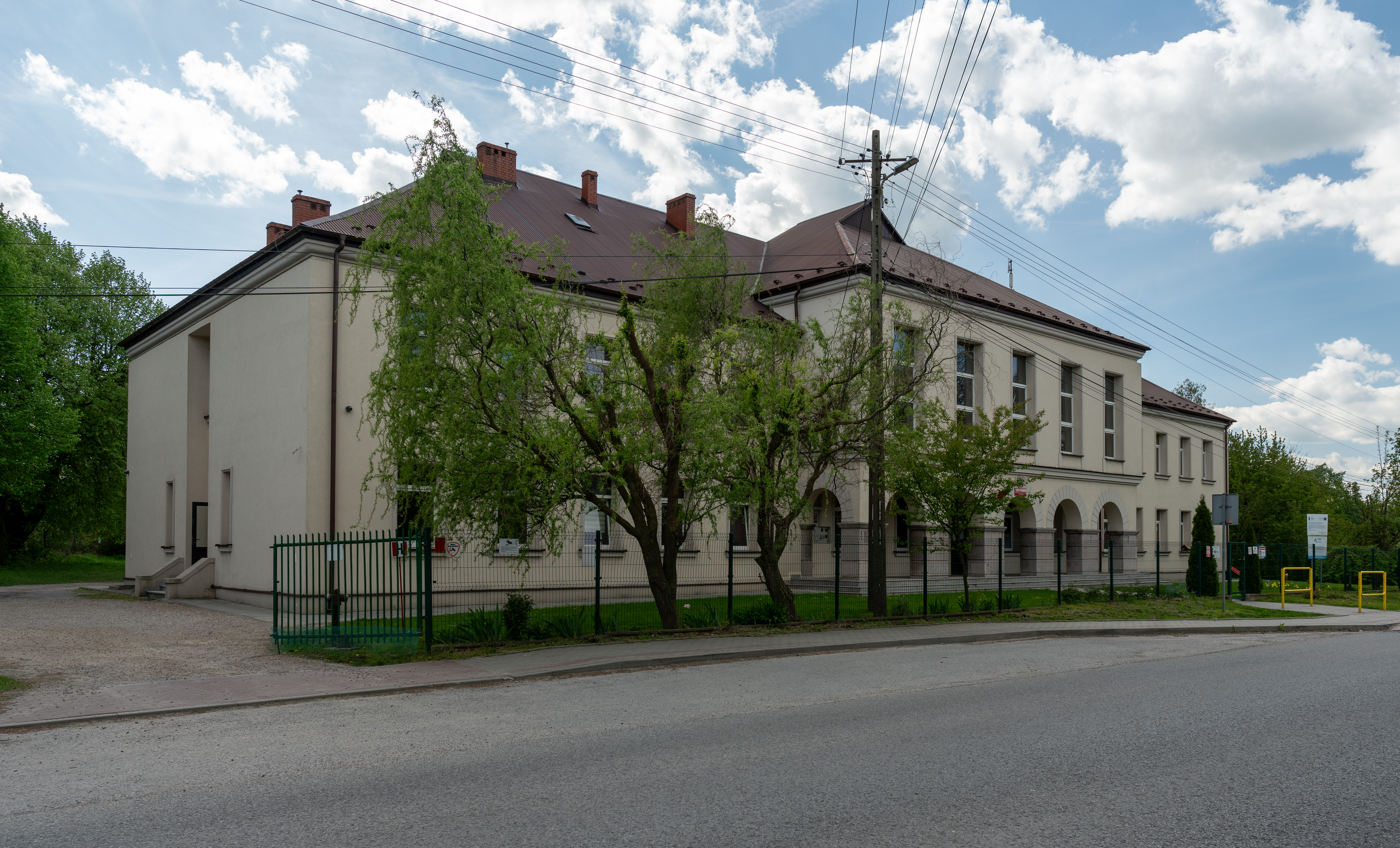
- School

- Location within Poland
- Coordinates: 50°19′37″N 20°0′7″E
- Country: Poland
- Voivodeship: Lesser Poland
- County: Miechów
- Gmina: Miechów
- Population: 490

Jaksice [jakˈɕit͡sɛ] is a village in the administrative district of Gmina Miechów, within Miechów County, Lesser Poland Voivodeship, in southern Poland.
