= Celiny Przesławickie =

- Village
- Location within Poland
- Coordinates: 50°19′2″N 19°58′52″E
- Country: Poland
- Voivodeship: Lesser Poland
- County: Miechów
- Gmina: Miechów
- Population: 100

Celiny Przesławickie [t͡sɛˈlinɨ pʂɛswaˈvit͡skʲɛ] is a village in the administrative district of Gmina Miechów, within Miechów County, Lesser Poland Voivodeship, in southern Poland.
