= Sławice Szlacheckie =

- Village
- Location within Poland
- Coordinates: 50°19′12″N 20°4′28″E
- Country: Poland
- Voivodeship: Lesser Poland
- County: Miechów
- Gmina: Miechów
- Population: 250

Sławice Szlacheckie [swaˈvit͡sɛ ʂlaˈxɛt͡skʲɛ] is a village in the administrative district of Gmina Miechów, within Miechów County, Lesser Poland Voivodeship, in southern Poland.
