= Nasiechowice =

- Village
- Location within Poland
- Coordinates: 50°18′33″N 20°8′22″E
- Country: Poland
- Voivodeship: Lesser Poland
- County: Miechów
- Gmina: Miechów
- Population: 390

Nasiechowice [naɕɛxɔˈvit͡sɛ] is a village in the administrative district of Gmina Miechów, within Miechów County, Lesser Poland Voivodeship, in southern Poland.
