= Dale, Lesser Poland Voivodeship =

Dale
- Village
- Location within Poland
- Coordinates: 50°21′N 20°13′E
- Country: Poland
- Voivodeship: Lesser Poland
- County: Miechów
- Gmina: Racławice

Dale [ˈdalɛ] is a village in the administrative district of Gmina Racławice, within Miechów County, Lesser Poland Voivodeship, in southern Poland.
