= Dziewięcioły =

- Village
- Location within Poland
- Coordinates: 50°18′13″N 20°11′9″E
- Country: Poland
- Voivodeship: Lesser Poland
- County: Miechów
- Gmina: Miechów
- Population: 230

Dziewięcioły [d͡ʑɛvjɛnˈt͡ɕɔwɨ] is a village in the administrative district of Gmina Miechów, within Miechów County, Lesser Poland Voivodeship, in southern Poland.
