= Górka Kościejowska =

- Village
- Location within Poland
- Coordinates: 50°18′41″N 20°15′25″E
- Country: Poland
- Voivodeship: Lesser Poland
- County: Miechów
- Gmina: Racławice
- Population: 180

Górka Kościejowska [ˈɡurka kɔɕt͡ɕɛˈjɔfska] is a village in the administrative district of Gmina Racławice, within Miechów County, Lesser Poland Voivodeship, in southern Poland.
