= Marchocice, Lesser Poland Voivodeship =

Marchocice
- Village
- Location within Poland
- Coordinates: 50°19′28″N 20°11′10″E
- Country: Poland
- Voivodeship: Lesser Poland
- County: Miechów
- Gmina: Racławice
- Population: 220

Marchocice [marxɔˈt͡ɕit͡sɛ] is a village in the administrative district of Gmina Racławice, within Miechów County, Lesser Poland Voivodeship, in southern Poland.
