= Wielkanoc, Lesser Poland Voivodeship =

Wielkanoc
- Village
- Location within Poland
- Coordinates: 50°20′24″N 19°54′51″E
- Country: Poland
- Voivodeship: Lesser Poland
- County: Miechów
- Gmina: Gołcza
- Population: 261
- Vehicle registration: KMI

Wielkanoc [vjɛlˈkanɔt͡s] is a village in the administrative district of Gmina Gołcza, within Miechów County, Lesser Poland Voivodeship, in southern Poland.
