= Czaple Wielkie =

- Village
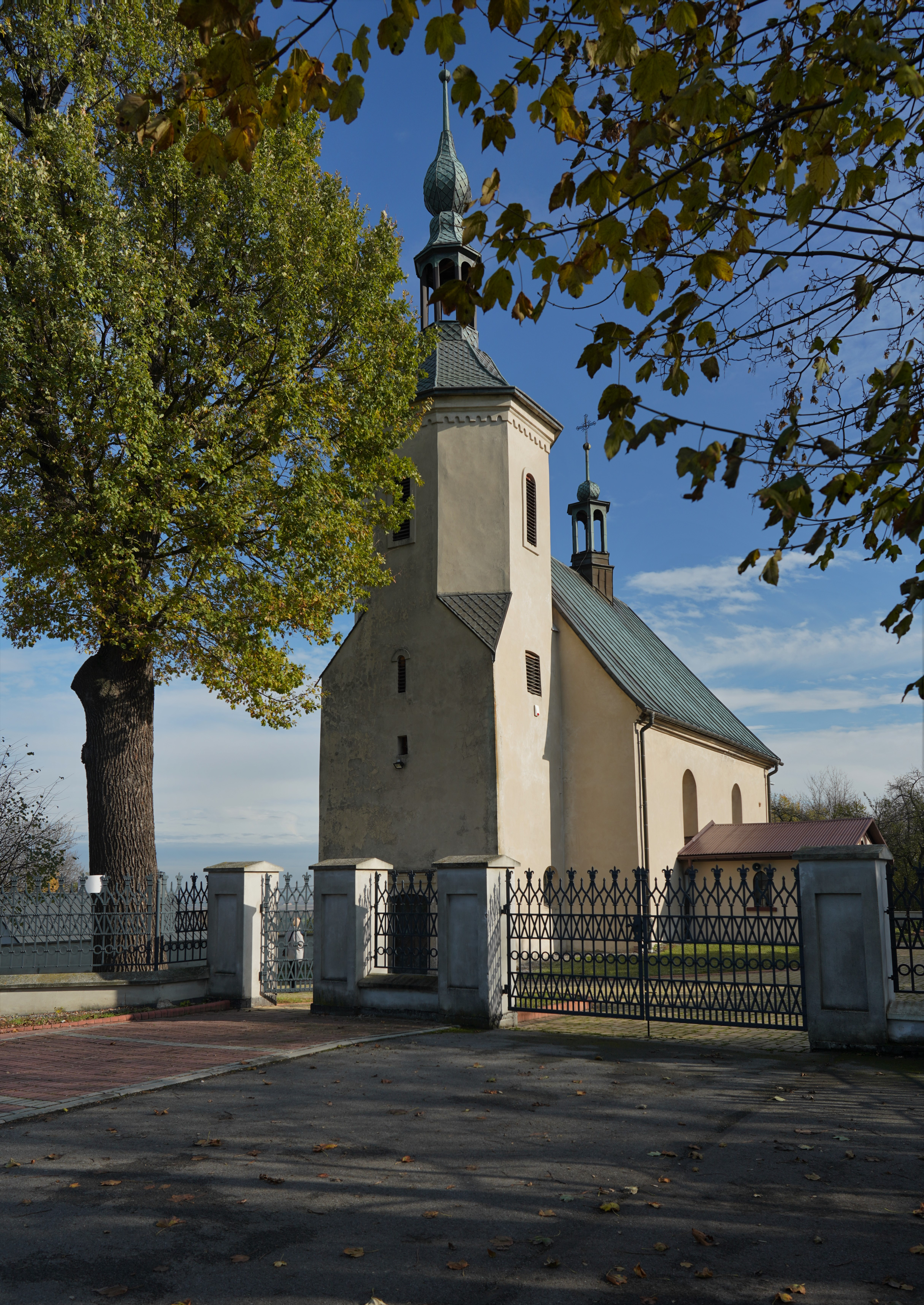
- Church of Saint Bartholomew

- Location within Poland
- Coordinates: 50°17′42″N 19°59′16″E
- Country: Poland
- Voivodeship: Lesser Poland
- County: Miechów
- Gmina: Gołcza

Population
  - Total: 478

Czaple Wielkie [ˈt͡ʂaplɛ ˈvjɛlkʲɛ] is a village in the administrative district of Gmina Gołcza, within Miechów County, Lesser Poland Voivodeship, in southern Poland.
