= Podleśna Wola =

- Village
- Location within Poland
- Coordinates: 50°24′39″N 20°0′32″E
- Country: Poland
- Voivodeship: Lesser Poland
- County: Miechów
- Gmina: Miechów

Podleśna Wola [pɔdˈlɛɕna ˈvɔla] is a village in the administrative district of Gmina Miechów, within Miechów County, Lesser Poland Voivodeship, in southern Poland.
