= Bryzdzyn =

- Village
- Location within Poland
- Coordinates: 50°28′29″N 20°3′4″E
- Country: Poland
- Voivodeship: Lesser Poland
- County: Miechów
- Gmina: Kozłów
- Population: 430

Bryzdzyn [ˈbrɨzd͡zɨn] is a village in the administrative district of Gmina Kozłów, within Miechów County, Lesser Poland Voivodeship, in southern Poland.
