= Makov =

Makov may refer to:

== Places ==
=== Azerbaijan ===
- Maqov, also called Makov, a municipality and village

=== Croatia ===
- Makov Hrib, a village in Croatia

=== Czech Republic ===
- Makov (Blansko District), a municipality and village in the South Moravian Region
- Makov (Svitavy District), a municipality and village in the Pardubice Region
- Makov, a village and part of Jistebnice in the South Bohemian Region
- Makov, a village and part of Předslav in the Plzeň Region

=== Slovakia ===
- Makov, Čadca District, a municipality and village in the Žilina Region
  - ŠK Javorník Makov, an association football club

== People ==
- Pavlo Makov, Ukrainian artist

== See also ==
- Maków (disambiguation)
- Makó, Hungary, called Makov in Slovak
