= Kamienica, Miechów County =

Kamienica
- Village
- Location within Poland
- Coordinates: 50°21′8″N 19°53′4″E
- Country: Poland
- Voivodeship: Lesser Poland
- County: Miechów
- Gmina: Gołcza
- Elevation: 399 m (1,309 ft)
- Population: 277

Kamienica [kamjɛˈnit͡sa] is a village in the administrative district of Gmina Gołcza, within Miechów County, Lesser Poland Voivodeship, in southern Poland.
