= Kalina Mała =

- Village
- Location within Poland
- Coordinates: 50°21′57″N 20°6′13″E
- Country: Poland
- Voivodeship: Lesser Poland
- County: Miechów
- Gmina: Miechów
- Population: 340

Kalina Mała [kaˈlina ˈmawa] is a village in the administrative district of Gmina Miechów, within Miechów County, Lesser Poland Voivodeship, in southern Poland.
