= Pstroszyce Pierwsze =

- Village
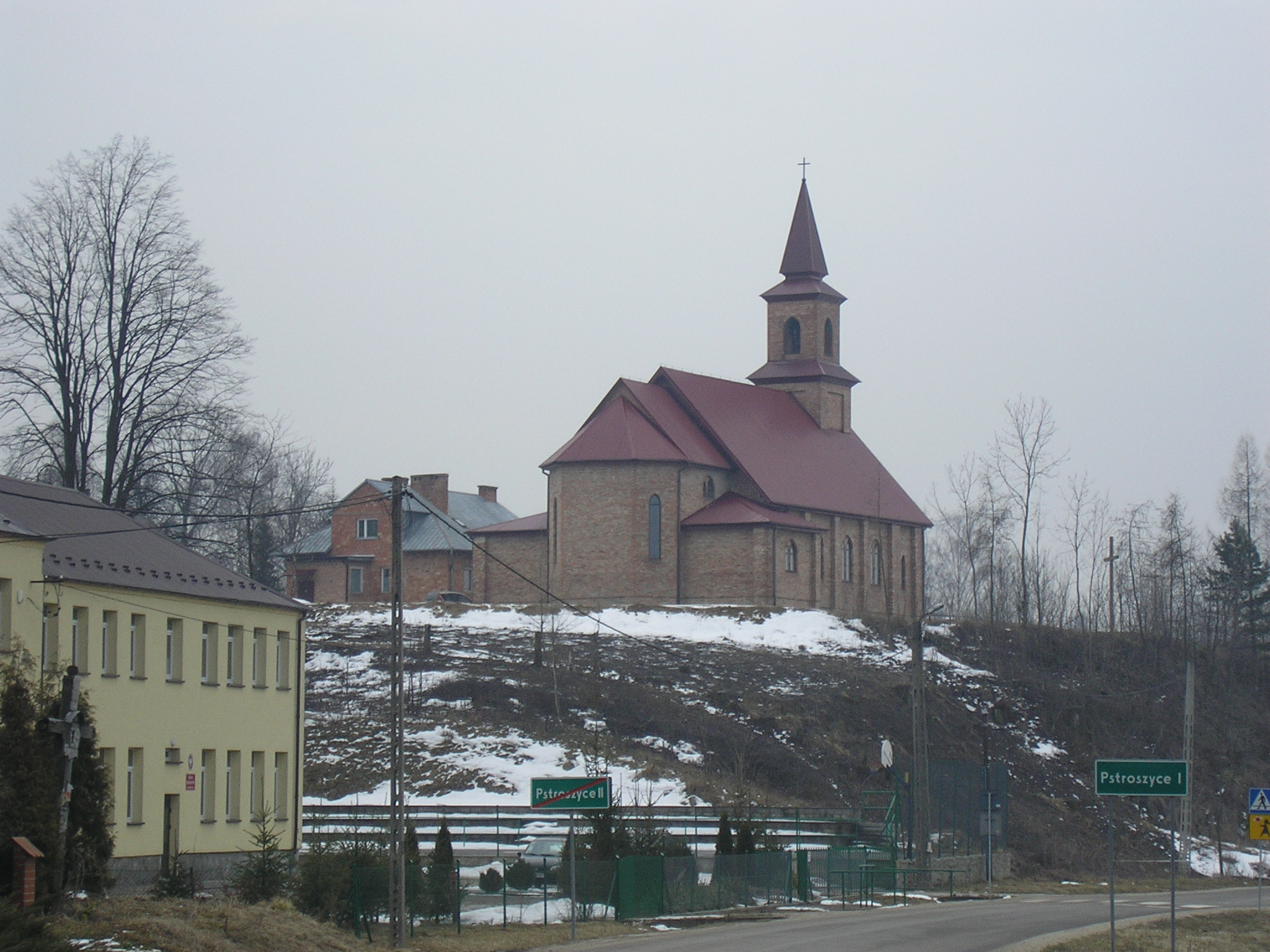

- Location within Poland
- Coordinates: 50°23′32″N 20°0′25″E
- Country: Poland
- Voivodeship: Lesser Poland
- County: Miechów
- Gmina: Miechów
- Population: 270

Pstroszyce Pierwsze [pstrɔˈʂɨt͡sɛ ˈpjɛrfʂɛ] is a village in the administrative district of Gmina Miechów, within Miechów County, Lesser Poland Voivodeship, in southern Poland.
