= Cieplice, Lesser Poland Voivodeship =

Cieplice
- Village
- Location within Poland
- Coordinates: 50°21′12″N 19°54′59″E
- Country: Poland
- Voivodeship: Lesser Poland
- County: Miechów
- Gmina: Gołcza
- Population: 137

Cieplice [t͡ɕɛˈplit͡sɛ] is a village in the administrative district of Gmina Gołcza, within Miechów County, Lesser Poland Voivodeship, in southern Poland.
