= Strzeżów Pierwszy =

- Village
- Location within Poland
- Coordinates: 50°22′49″N 20°3′30″E
- Country: Poland
- Voivodeship: Lesser Poland
- County: Miechów
- Gmina: Miechów
- Population: 270

Strzeżów Pierwszy [ˈstʂɛʐuf ˈpjɛrfʂɨ] is a village in the administrative district of Gmina Miechów, within Miechów County, Lesser Poland Voivodeship, in southern Poland.
