= Przysieka, Lesser Poland Voivodeship =

Przysieka
- Village
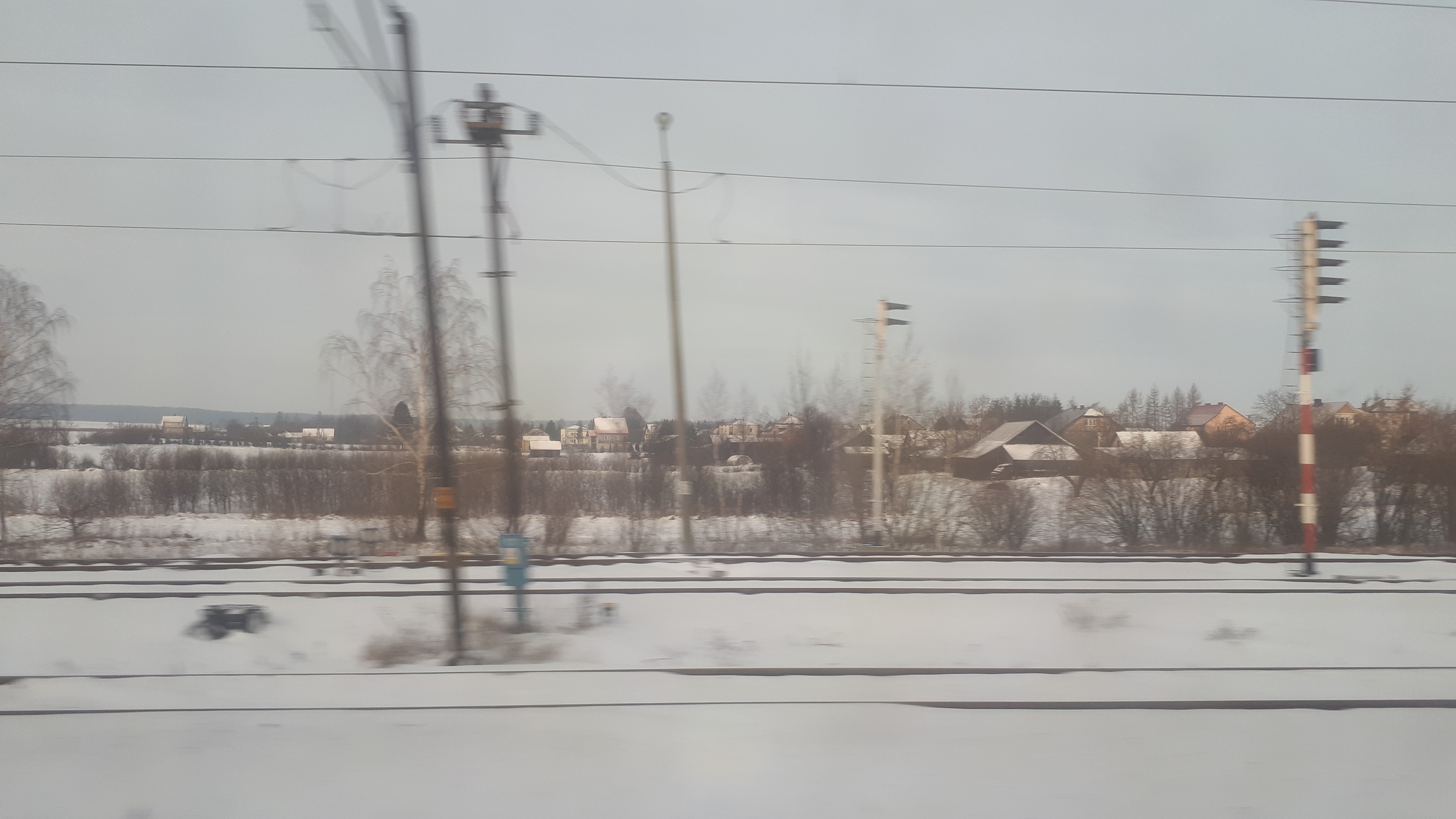

- Location within Poland
- Coordinates: 50°28′27″N 19°59′30″E
- Country: Poland
- Voivodeship: Lesser Poland
- County: Miechów
- Gmina: Kozłów
- Population: 630

Przysieka [pʂɨˈɕɛka] is a village in the administrative district of Gmina Kozłów, within Miechów County, Lesser Poland Voivodeship, in southern Poland.
