= Kamionka, Lesser Poland Voivodeship =

Kamionka
- Village
- Location within Poland
- Coordinates: 50°27′39″N 20°1′41″E
- Country: Poland
- Voivodeship: Lesser Poland
- County: Miechów
- Gmina: Kozłów
- Population: 420

Kamionka [kaˈmjɔnka] is a village in the administrative district of Gmina Kozłów, within Miechów County, Lesser Poland Voivodeship, in southern Poland.
