= Wymysłów, Gmina Miechów =

Wymysłów
- Village
- Location within Poland
- Coordinates: 50°20′12″N 20°4′26″E
- Country: Poland
- Voivodeship: Lesser Poland
- County: Miechów
- Gmina: Miechów

Wymysłów [vɨˈmɨswuf] is a village in the administrative district of Gmina Miechów, within Miechów County, Lesser Poland Voivodeship, in southern Poland.
