= Kępie =

Kępie may refer to the following places:

- Kępie, Lesser Poland Voivodeship (south Poland)
- Kępie, Sandomierz County in Świętokrzyskie Voivodeship (south-central Poland)
- Kępie, Staszów County in Świętokrzyskie Voivodeship (south-central Poland)
