= Dziemięrzyce =

- Village
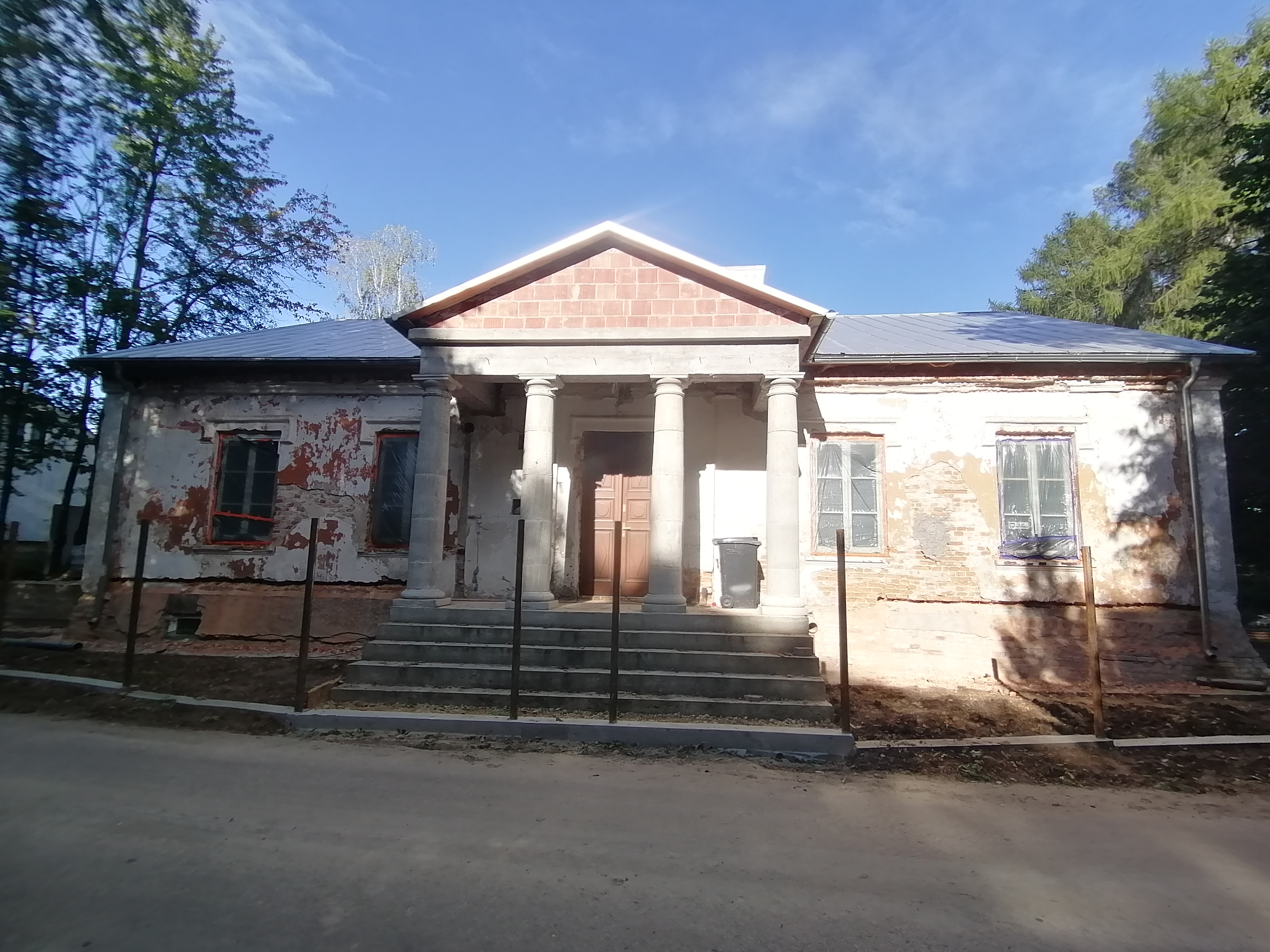
- Manor house

- Location within Poland
- Coordinates: 50°18′12″N 20°12′39″E
- Country: Poland
- Voivodeship: Lesser Poland
- County: Miechów
- Gmina: Racławice

Population
  - Total: 200

Dziemięrzyce [d͡ʑɛmjenˈʐɨt͡sɛ] (Dziemierzyce until 31 December 2012) is a village in the administrative district of Gmina Racławice, within Miechów County, Lesser Poland Voivodeship, in southern Poland.
