= Falniów-Wysiołek =

- Village
- Location within Poland
- Coordinates: 50°21′5″N 19°57′26″E
- Country: Poland
- Voivodeship: Lesser Poland
- County: Miechów
- Gmina: Miechów
- Elevation: 300 m (980 ft)
- Population: 320

Falniów-Wysiołek [ˈfalɲuf vɨˈɕɔwɛk] is a village in the administrative district of Gmina Miechów, within Miechów County, Lesser Poland Voivodeship, in southern Poland.
