= Chobędza =

- Village
- Location within Poland
- Coordinates: 50°20′22″N 19°53′42″E
- Country: Poland
- Voivodeship: Lesser Poland
- County: Miechów
- Gmina: Gołcza
- Population: 222

Chobędza [xɔˈbɛnd͡za] is a village in the administrative district of Gmina Gołcza, within Miechów County, Lesser Poland Voivodeship, in southern Poland.
