= Marcinowice, Lesser Poland Voivodeship =

Marcinowice
- Village
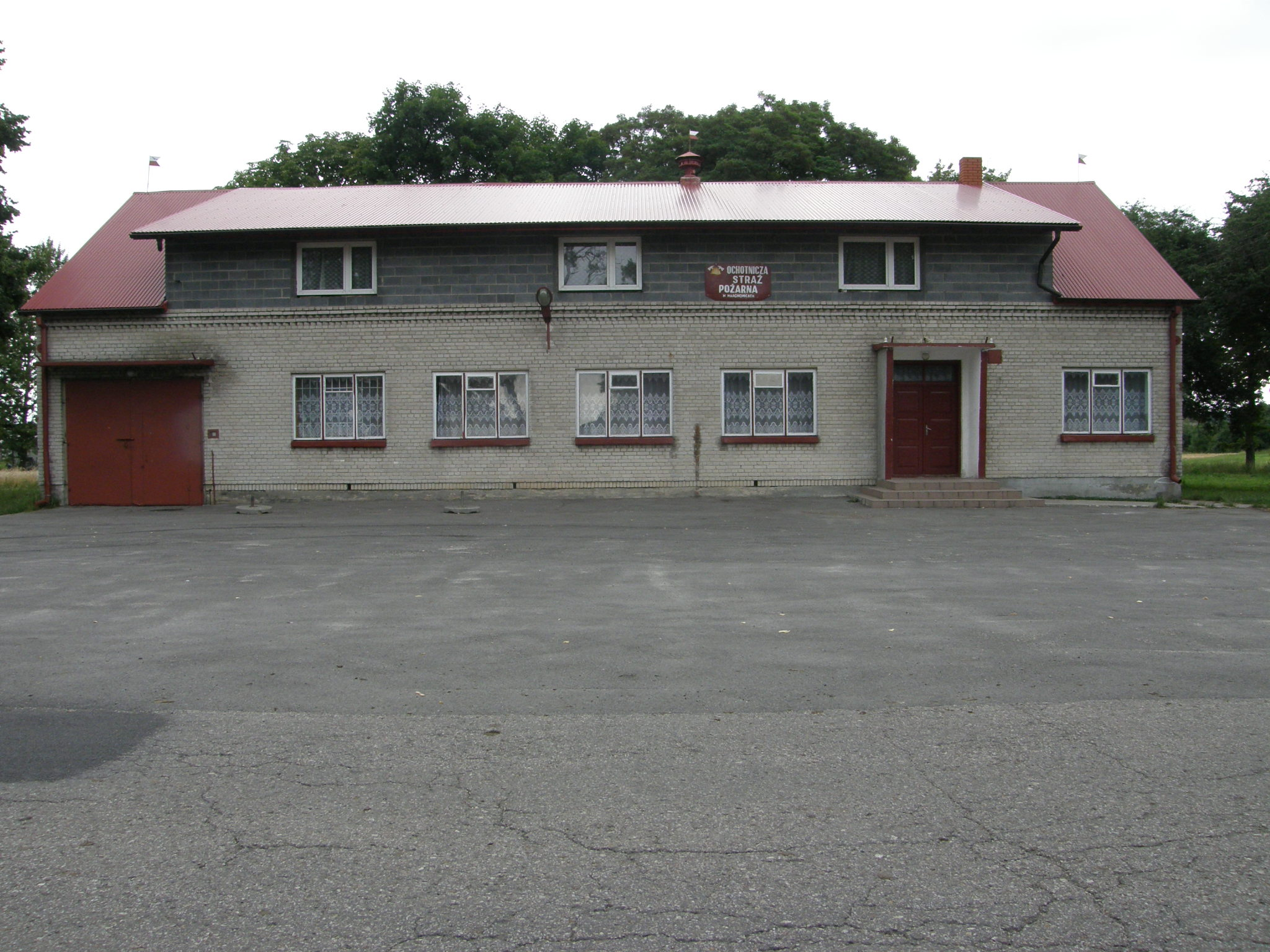
- Fire station

- Location within Poland
- Coordinates: 50°29′56″N 19°59′29″E
- Country: Poland
- Voivodeship: Lesser Poland
- County: Miechów
- Gmina: Kozłów
- Population: 480

Marcinowice [mart͡ɕinɔˈvit͡sɛ] is a village in the administrative district of Gmina Kozłów, within Miechów County, Lesser Poland Voivodeship, in southern Poland.
