= Glinica, Lesser Poland Voivodeship =

Glinica
- Village
- Location within Poland
- Coordinates: 50°18′20″N 20°4′47″E
- Country: Poland
- Voivodeship: Lesser Poland
- County: Miechów
- Gmina: Miechów
- Population: 160

Glinica [ɡliˈnit͡sa] is a village in the administrative district of Gmina Miechów, within Miechów County, Lesser Poland Voivodeship, in southern Poland.
