= Trzebienice =

- Village
- Location within Poland
- Coordinates: 50°21′27″N 19°51′13″E
- Country: Poland
- Voivodeship: Lesser Poland
- County: Miechów
- Gmina: Gołcza
- Population: 280

Trzebienice [tʂɛbjɛˈnit͡sɛ] is a village in the administrative district of Gmina Gołcza, within Miechów County, Lesser Poland Voivodeship, in southern Poland.
