= Gmina Kozłów =

Gmina Kozłów Kozłów Commune
- Gmina
- Interactive map of Gmina Kozłów
- Coordinates (Kozłów): 50°29′6″N 20°1′26″E
- Country: Poland
- Voivodeship: Lesser Poland
- County: Miechów
- Seat: Kozłów

Area
  - Total: 85.84 km^{2} (33.14 sq mi)

Population (2006)
  - Total: 5,004
  - Density: 58.29/km^{2} (151.0/sq mi)
- Website: http://www.kozlow.pl

Gmina Kozłów is a rural gmina (administrative district) in Miechów County, Lesser Poland Voivodeship, in southern Poland. Its seat is the village of Kozłów, which lies approximately 15 kilometres (9 mi) north of Miechów and 48 km (30 mi) north of the regional capital Kraków.

The gmina covers an area of 85.84 square kilometres (33.1 sq mi), and as of 2006 its total population is 5,004.

== Villages ==
Gmina Kozłów contains the villages and settlements of Bogdanów, Bryzdzyn, Kamionka, Karczowice, Kępie, Kozłów, Marcinowice, Przybysławice, Przysieka, Rogów, Wierzbica and Wolica.

== Neighbouring gminas ==
Gmina Kozłów is bordered by the gminas of Charsznica, Książ Wielki, Sędziszów, Wodzisław and Żarnowiec.
