= Gmina Gołcza =

Gmina Gołcza Gołcza Commune
- Gmina
- Flag Coat of arms
- Interactive map of Gmina Gołcza
- Coordinates (Gołcza): 50°20′13″N 19°55′39″E
- Country: Poland
- Voivodeship: Lesser Poland
- County: Miechów
- Seat: Gołcza

Area
  - Total: 90.27 km^{2} (34.85 sq mi)

Population (2006)
  - Total: 6,265
  - Density: 69.40/km^{2} (179.8/sq mi)
- Website: http://www.golcza.pl/

Gmina Gołcza is a rural gmina (administrative district) in Miechów County, Lesser Poland Voivodeship, in southern Poland. Its seat is the village of Gołcza, which lies approximately 8 kilometres (5 mi) west of Miechów and 31 km (19 mi) north of the regional capital Kraków.

The gmina covers an area of 90.27 square kilometres (34.9 sq mi), and as of 2006 its total population is 6,265.

The gmina contains part of the protected area called Dłubnia Landscape Park.

== Villages ==
Gmina Gołcza contains the villages and settlements of Adamowice, Buk, Chobędza, Cieplice, Czaple Małe, Czaple Wielkie, Gołcza, Kamienica, Krępa, Laski Dworskie, Maków, Mostek, Przybysławice, Rzeżuśnia, Szreniawa, Trzebienice, Ulina Mała, Ulina Wielka, Wielkanoc, Wysocice, Żarnowica and Zawadka.

== Neighbouring gminas ==
Gmina Gołcza is bordered by the gminas of Charsznica, Iwanowice, Miechów, Skała, Słomniki, Trzyciąż and Wolbrom.
