= Karczowice, Lesser Poland Voivodeship =

Karczowice
- Village
- Location within Poland
- Coordinates: 50°30′24″N 19°58′29″E
- Country: Poland
- Voivodeship: Lesser Poland
- County: Miechów
- Gmina: Kozłów
- Population: 220

Karczowice [kart͡ʂɔˈvit͡sɛ] is a village in the administrative district of Gmina Kozłów, within Miechów County, Lesser Poland Voivodeship, in southern Poland.
