= Racławice =

- Village
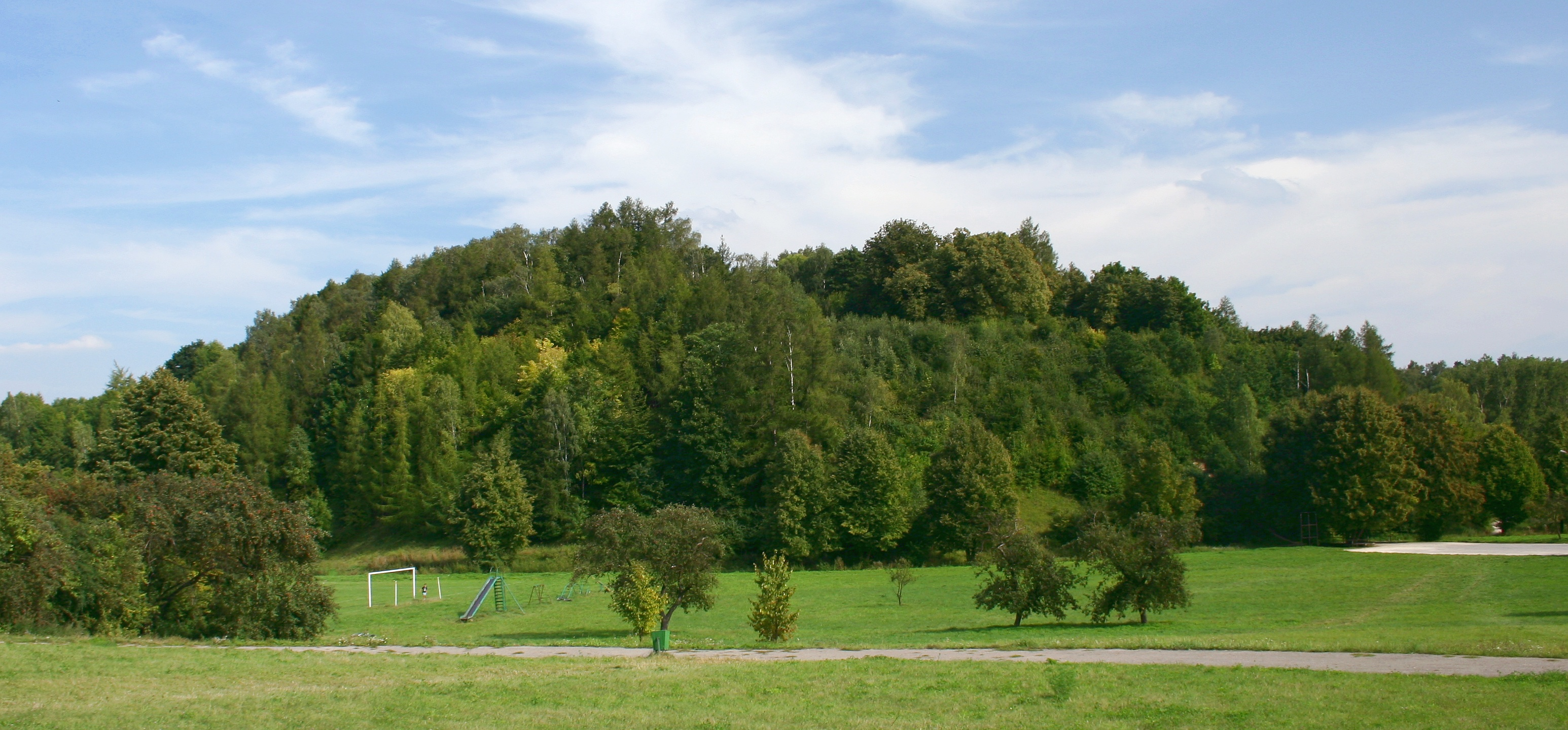
- The Kościuszko Mound

- Location within Poland
- Coordinates: 50°19′47″N 20°13′56″E
- Country: Poland
- Voivodeship: Lesser Poland
- County: Miechów
- Gmina: Racławice

Racławice [rat͡swaˈvit͡sɛ] is a village located in Lesser Poland Voivodeship in southern Poland. It became famous after the victorious Battle of Racławice (1794) in the Kościuszko Uprising. It is the seat of a municipality (Gmina Racławice) within Miechów County.

The battle site is one of Poland's official national Historic Monuments (Pomnik historii), as designated May 1, 2004. Its listing is maintained by the National Heritage Board of Poland.

== See also ==
- Racławice Panorama
