= Poradów, Lesser Poland Voivodeship =

Poradów
- Village
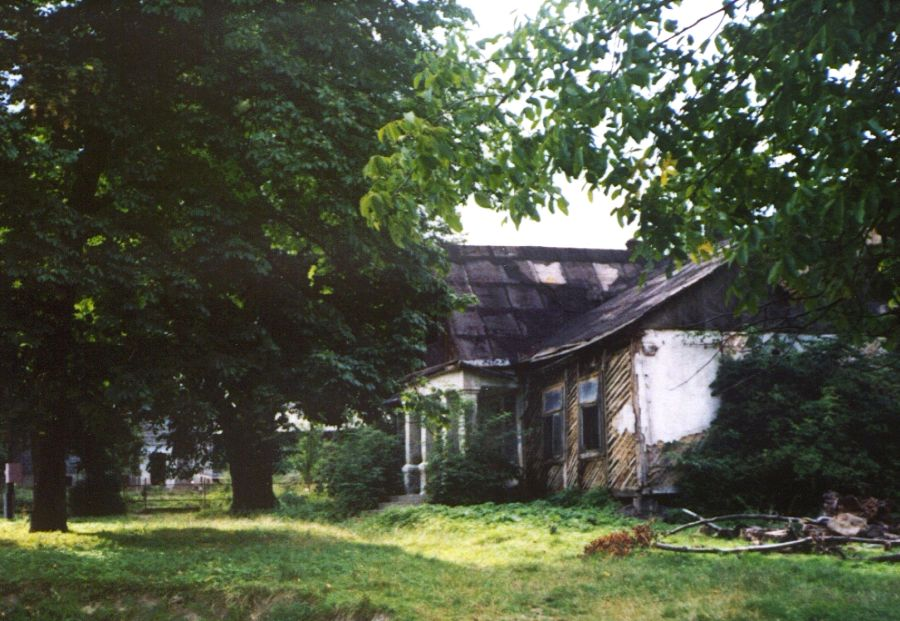

- Location within Poland
- Coordinates: 50°20′9″N 20°2′4″E
- Country: Poland
- Voivodeship: Lesser Poland
- County: Miechów
- Gmina: Miechów
- Population: 170

Poradów [pɔˈraduf] is a village in the administrative district of Gmina Miechów, within Miechów County, Lesser Poland Voivodeship, in southern Poland.
