= Gołcza =

- Village
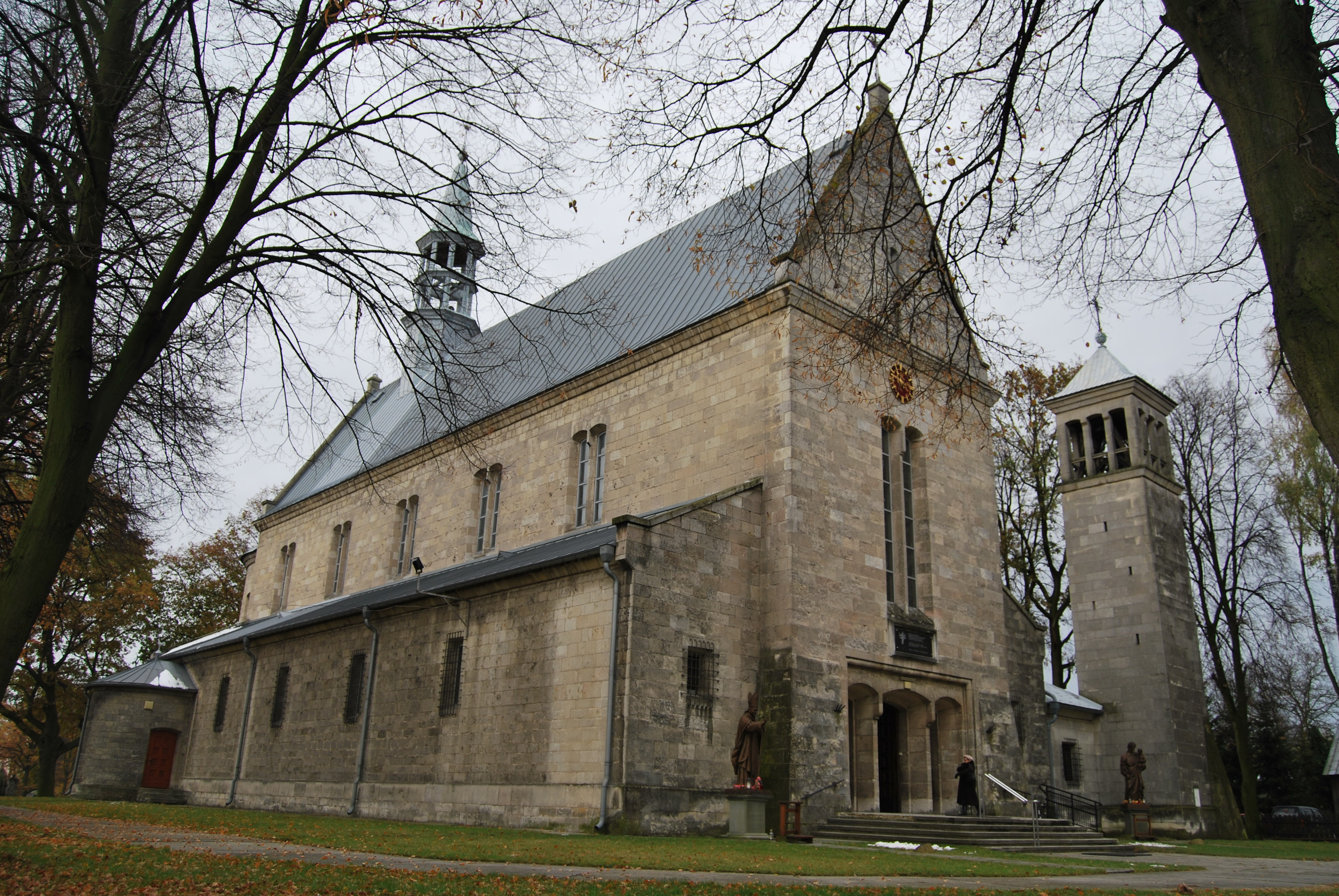
- Assumption of Mary Church

- Location within Poland
- Coordinates: 50°20′13″N 19°55′39″E
- Country: Poland
- Voivodeship: Lesser Poland
- County: Miechów
- Gmina: Gołcza
- Population: 484

Gołcza [ˈɡɔu̯t͡ʂa] is a village in Miechów County, Lesser Poland Voivodeship, in southern Poland. It is the seat of the gmina (administrative district) called Gmina Gołcza.
