= Gmina Racławice =

Gmina Racławice Racławice Commune
- Gmina
- Coat of arms
- Interactive map of Gmina Racławice
- Coordinates (Racławice): 50°19′47″N 20°13′56″E
- Country: Poland
- Voivodeship: Lesser Poland
- County: Miechów
- Seat: Racławice

Area
  - Total: 59.18 km^{2} (22.85 sq mi)

Population (2006)
  - Total: 2,514
  - Density: 42.48/km^{2} (110.0/sq mi)

Gmina Racławice is a rural gmina (administrative district) in Miechów County, Lesser Poland Voivodeship, in southern Poland. Its seat is the village of Racławice, which lies approximately 15 kilometres (9 mi) east of Miechów and 37 km (23 mi) north-east of the regional capital Kraków.

The gmina covers an area of 59.18 square kilometres (22.8 sq mi), and as of 2006 its total population is 2,514.

== Villages ==
Gmina Racławice contains the villages and settlements of Dale, Dosłońce, Dziemierzyce, Głupczów, Górka Kościejowska, Góry Miechowskie, Janowiczki, Klonów, Kościejów, Marchocice, Miroszów and Racławice.

== Neighbouring gminas ==
Gmina Racławice is bordered by the gminas of Działoszyce, Miechów, Pałecznica, Radziemice, Skalbmierz and Słaboszów.
