= Przybysławice, Gmina Gołcza =

Przybysławice
- Village
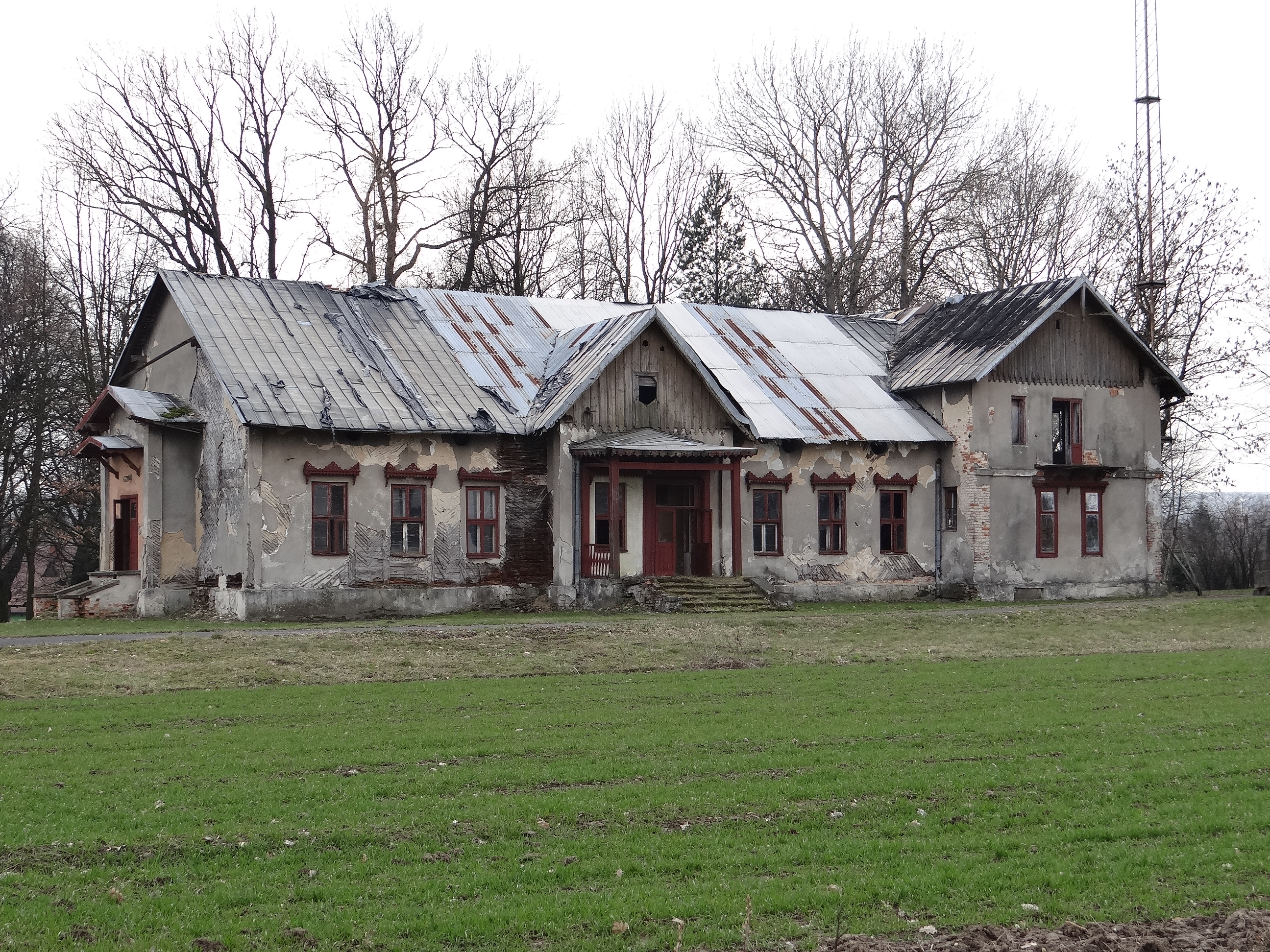

- Location within Poland
- Coordinates: 50°22′39″N 19°52′56″E
- Country: Poland
- Voivodeship: Lesser Poland
- County: Miechów
- Gmina: Gołcza
- Population: 345

Przybysławice [pʂɨbɨswaˈvit͡sɛ] is a village in the administrative district of Gmina Gołcza, within Miechów County, Lesser Poland Voivodeship, in southern Poland.
