= Przybysławice, Gmina Kozłów =

Przybysławice
- Village
- Location within Poland
- Coordinates: 50°26′45″N 20°3′36″E
- Country: Poland
- Voivodeship: Lesser Poland
- County: Miechów
- Gmina: Kozłów
- Population: 490

Przybysławice [pʂɨbɨswaˈvit͡sɛ] is a village in the administrative district of Gmina Kozłów, within Miechów County, Lesser Poland Voivodeship, in southern Poland.
