= Maków, Lesser Poland Voivodeship =

Maków
- Village
- Location within Poland
- Coordinates: 50°21′52″N 19°53′51″E
- Country: Poland
- Voivodeship: Lesser Poland
- County: Miechów
- Gmina: Gołcza
- Population: 406

Maków [ˈmakuf] is a village in the administrative district of Gmina Gołcza, within Miechów County, Lesser Poland Voivodeship, in southern Poland.
