= Gmina Miechów =

Gmina Miechów Miechów Commune
- Gmina
- Coat of arms
- Interactive map of Gmina Miechów
- Coordinates (Miechów): 50°21′28″N 20°1′57″E
- Country: Poland
- Voivodeship: Lesser Poland
- County: Miechów
- Seat: Miechów

Area
  - Total: 132.91 km^{2} (51.32 sq mi)

Population (2006)
  - Total: 19,786
  - Density: 148.87/km^{2} (385.57/sq mi)
  - Urban: 11,717
  - Rural: 8,069
- Website: http://www.miechow.eu/

Gmina Miechów is an urban-rural gmina (administrative district) in Miechów County, Lesser Poland Voivodeship, in southern Poland. Its seat is the town of Miechów, which lies approximately 34 kilometres (21 mi) north of the regional capital Kraków.

The gmina covers an area of 132.91 square kilometres (51.3 sq mi), and as of 2006 its total population is 19,786 (out of which the population of Miechów amounts to 11,717, and the population of the rural part of the gmina is 8,069).

== Villages ==
Apart from the town of Miechów, Gmina Miechów contains the villages and settlements of Biskupice, Brzuchania, Bukowska Wola, Celiny Przesławickie, Dziewięcioły, Falniów, Falniów-Wysiołek, Glinica, Jaksice, Kalina Mała, Kalina-Lisiniec, Kalina-Rędziny, Kamieńczyce, Komorów, Nasiechowice, Parkoszowice, Podleśna Wola, Podmiejska Wola, Pojałowice, Poradów, Przesławice, Pstroszyce Drugie, Pstroszyce Pierwsze, Siedliska, Sławice Szlacheckie, Strzeżów Drugi, Strzeżów Pierwszy, Szczepanowice, Widnica, Wielki Dół, Wymysłów, Zagorzyce, Zapustka and Zarogów.

== Neighbouring gminas ==
Gmina Miechów is bordered by the gminas of Charsznica, Gołcza, Książ Wielki, Racławice, Radziemice, Słaboszów and Słomniki.
