= Mostek, Lesser Poland Voivodeship =

Mostek
- Village
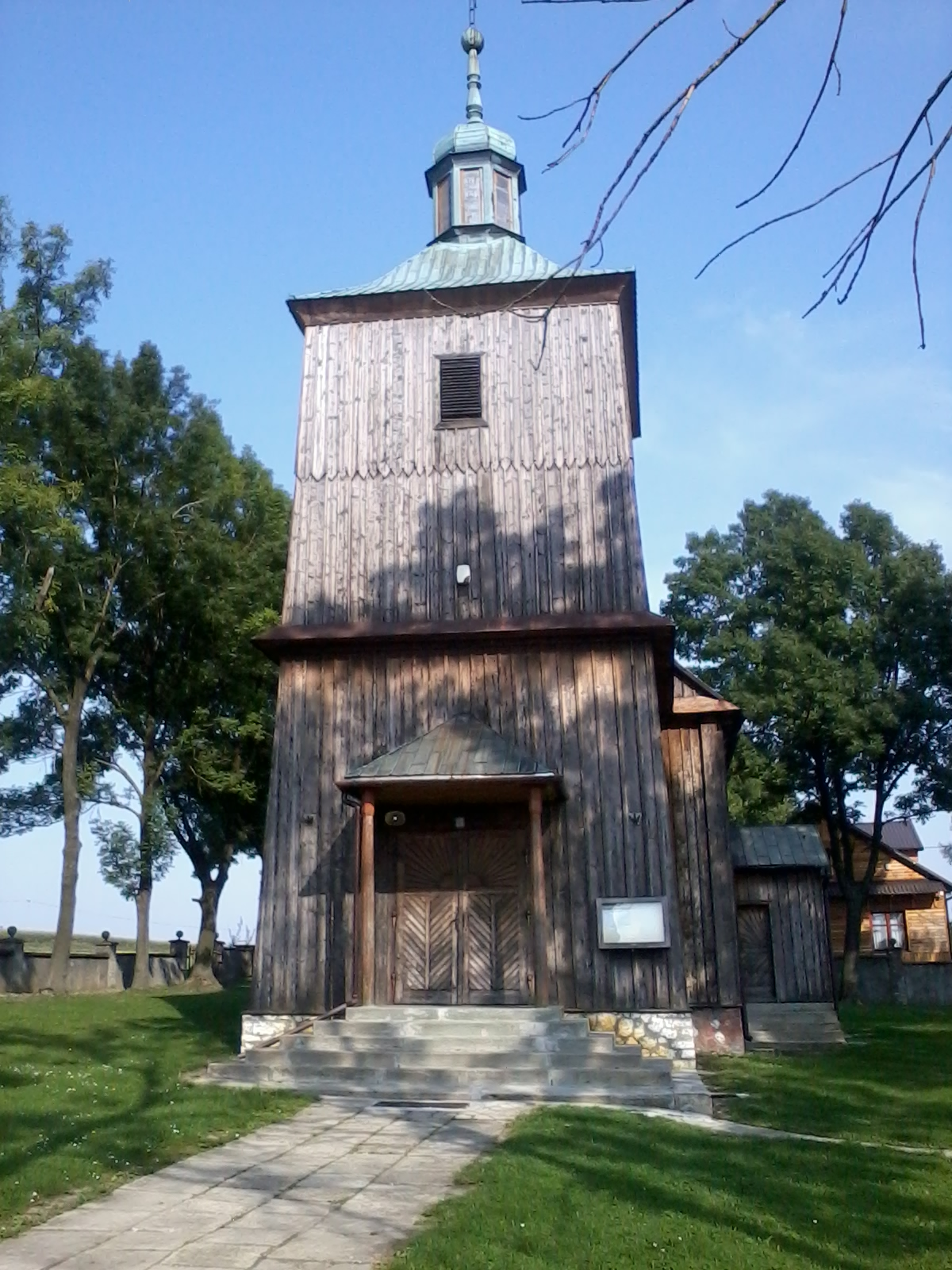
- Local Catholic church

- Location within Poland
- Coordinates: 50°20′10″N 19°50′33″E
- Country: Poland
- Voivodeship: Lesser Poland
- County: Miechów
- Gmina: Gołcza
- Population: 368

Mostek [ˈmɔstɛk] is a village in the administrative district of Gmina Gołcza, within Miechów County, Lesser Poland Voivodeship, in southern Poland.
