= Janowiczki, Lesser Poland Voivodeship =

Janowiczki
- Village
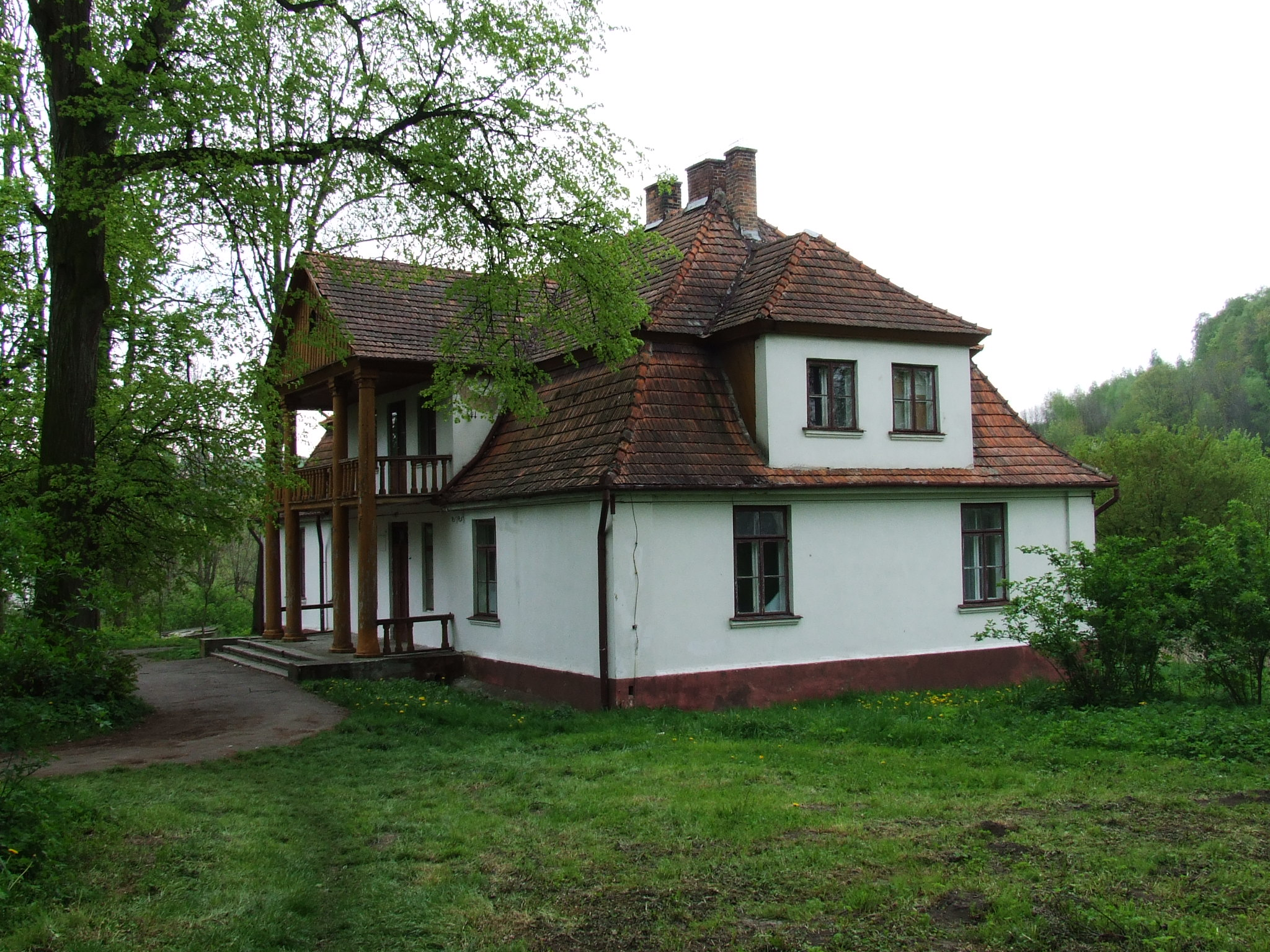
- Manor house

- Location within Poland
- Coordinates: 50°18′57″N 20°14′13″E
- Country: Poland
- Voivodeship: Lesser Poland
- County: Miechów
- Gmina: Racławice
- Population: 250

Janowiczki [janɔˈvit͡ʂki] is a village in the administrative district of Gmina Racławice, within Miechów County, Lesser Poland Voivodeship, in southern Poland.
