= Kępie, Lesser Poland Voivodeship =

Kępie
- Village
- Location within Poland
- Coordinates: 50°27′33″N 19°56′13″E
- Country: Poland
- Voivodeship: Lesser Poland
- County: Miechów
- Gmina: Kozłów
- Population: 640

Kępie [ˈkɛmpjɛ] is a village in the administrative district of Gmina Kozłów, within Miechów County, Lesser Poland Voivodeship, in southern Poland.
