= Kozłów, Miechów County =

Kozłów
- Village
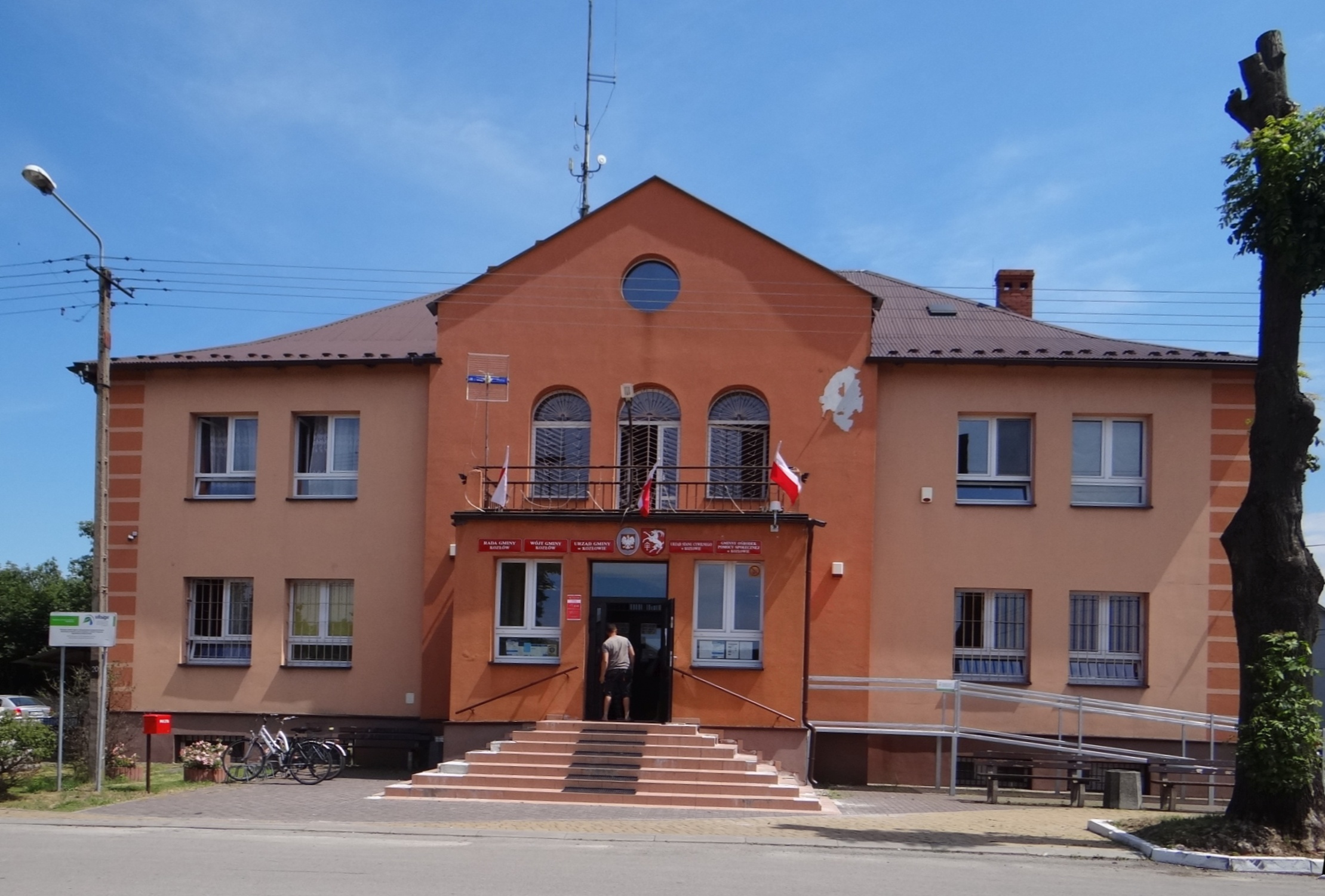
- Gmina office

- Location within Poland
- Coordinates: 50°29′6″N 20°1′26″E
- Country: Poland
- Voivodeship: Lesser Poland
- County: Miechów
- Gmina: Kozłów
- Population: 1,100

Kozłów [ˈkɔzwuf] is a village in Miechów County, Lesser Poland Voivodeship, in southern Poland. It is the seat of the gmina (administrative district) called Gmina Kozłów.
