= Makov (Blansko District) =

- Municipality
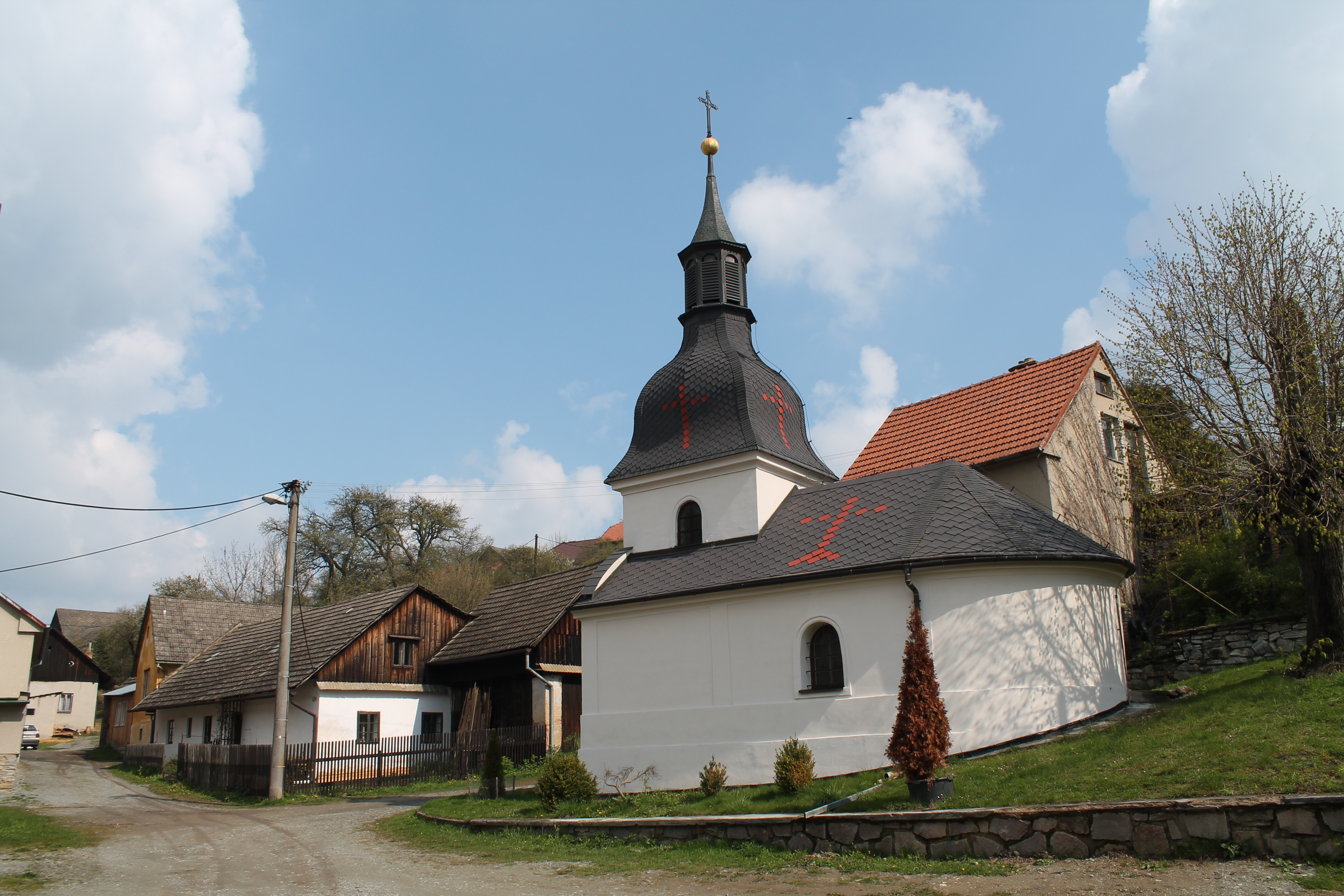
- Chapel of the Holy Trinity

- Location in the Czech Republic
- Coordinates: 49°31′9″N 16°29′1″E
- Country: Czech Republic
- Region: South Moravian
- District: Blansko
- First mentioned: 1374

Area
  - Total: 2.54 km^{2} (0.98 sq mi)
- Elevation: 530 m (1,740 ft)

Population (2026-01-01)
  - Total: 53
  - Density: 21/km^{2} (54/sq mi)
- Time zone: UTC+1 (CET)
  - Summer (DST): UTC+2 (CEST)
- Postal code: 679 72
- Website: www.makovukunstatu.cz

Makov is a municipality and village in Blansko District in the South Moravian Region of the Czech Republic. It has about 50 inhabitants.

Makov lies approximately 21 kilometres (13 mi) north-west of Blansko, 37 km (23 mi) north of Brno, and 162 km (101 mi) south-east of Prague.

== Demographics ==
Historical population
Year	Pop.	±%
1869	200	—
1880	236	+18.0%
1890	196	−16.9%
1900	196	+0.0%
1910	216	+10.2%
1921	201	−6.9%
1930	209	+4.0%
1950	183	−12.4%
1961	177	−3.3%
1970	155	−12.4%
1980	126	−18.7%
1991	74	−41.3%
2001	56	−24.3%
2011	45	−19.6%
2021	45	+0.0%
Source: Censuses
