= Mostek (Trutnov District) =

- Municipality
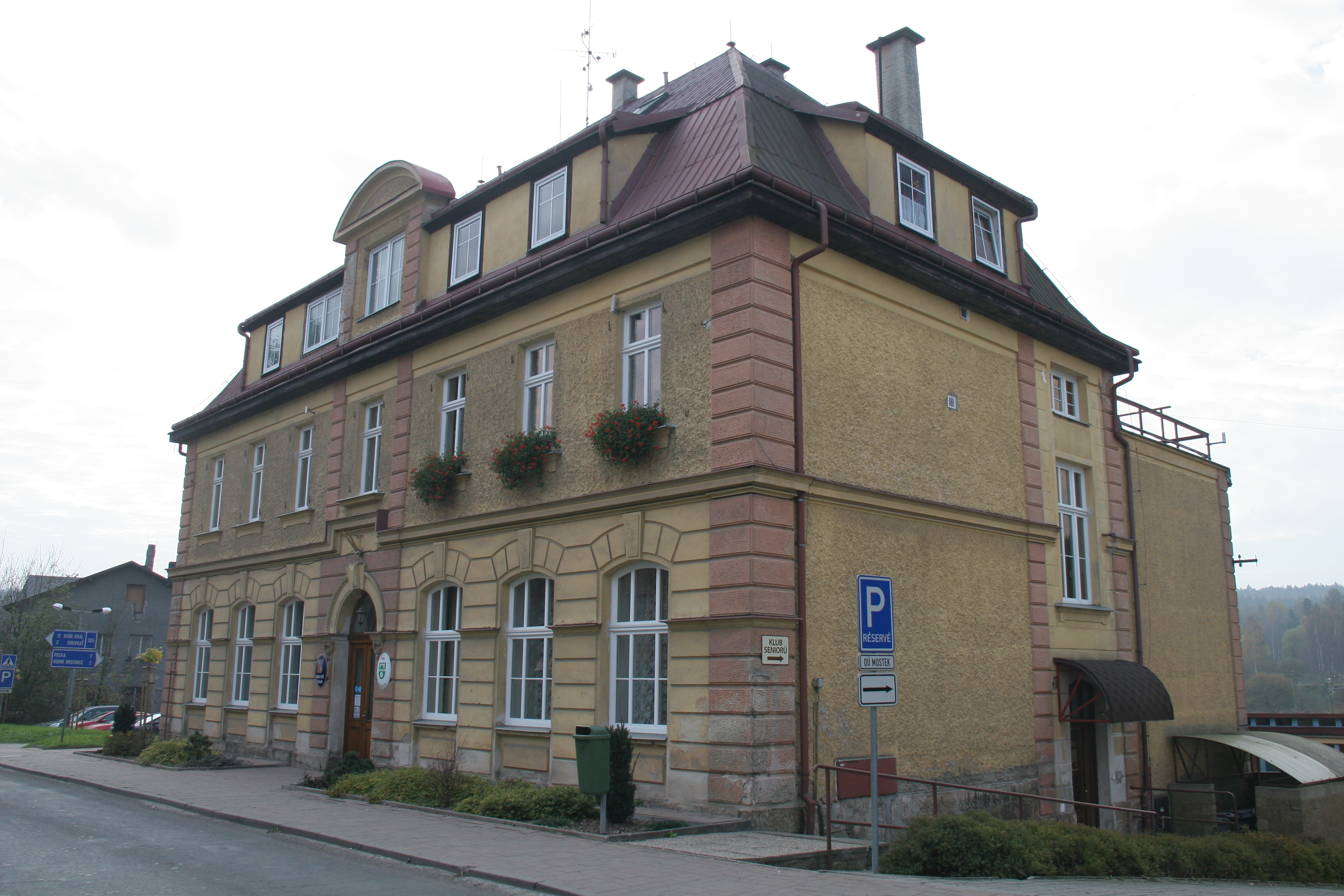
- Municipal office

- Flag Coat of arms

- Location in the Czech Republic
- Coordinates: 50°29′11″N 15°41′47″E
- Country: Czech Republic
- Region: Hradec Králové
- District: Trutnov
- First mentioned: 1560

Area
  - Total: 13.31 km^{2} (5.14 sq mi)
- Elevation: 439 m (1,440 ft)

Population (2026-01-01)
  - Total: 1,176
  - Density: 88.35/km^{2} (228.8/sq mi)
- Time zone: UTC+1 (CET)
  - Summer (DST): UTC+2 (CEST)
- Postal codes: 543 71, 544 75
- Website: www.mostek.cz

Mostek is a municipality and village in Trutnov District in the Hradec Králové Region of the Czech Republic. It has about 1,200 inhabitants.

== Administrative division ==
Mostek consists of four municipal parts (in brackets population according to the 2021 census):

- Mostek (785)
- Debrné (80)
- Souvrať (211)
- Zadní Mostek (82)

== Etymology ==
The name means 'little bridge' in Czech.

== Geography ==
Mostek is located about 17 kilometres (11 mi) southwest of Trutnov and 32 km (20 mi) north of Hradec Králové. It lies in the Giant Mountains Foothills. The highest point is a nameless hill at 548 m (1,798 ft) above sea level. The municipality is situated on the right bank of the Elbe River. The stream Borecký potok flows through the village of Mostek and connects with the Elbe on the southeastern municipal border of Mostek.

== History ==
The first written mention of Mostek is from 1560. Until the establishment of independent municipalities in 1849, Mostek belonged to the Nové Zámky and Hostinné estates. In 1870, the railway station in Mostek was opened, which was an impetus for the development of the village. At the end of 1900, a factory for the production of sharpening stones was established.

From 1849 to 1925, Mostek was a municipal part of Souvrať. Since 1925, it has been a separate municipality. In 1960, Souvrať and Debrné were annexed to Mostek.

Until World War II, ethnic Germans formed majority in Mostek, but there were both Czech and German primary schools in the village. After World War II, the German-speaking inhabitants were expelled and the municipality was partly resettled by Czechs.

== Demographics ==
Historical population

Year	Pop.	±%
1869	2,176	—
1880	2,225	+2.3%
1890	2,266	+1.8%
1900	2,139	−5.6%
1910	2,266	+5.9%

Year	Pop.	±%
1921	2,039	−10.0%
1930	2,063	+1.2%
1950	1,483	−28.1%
1961	1,615	+8.9%
1970	1,611	−0.2%

Year	Pop.	±%
1980	1,584	−1.7%
1991	1,379	−12.9%
2001	1,392	+0.9%
2011	1,204	−13.5%
2021	1,158	−3.8%

Source: Censuses

== Transport ==
Mostek is located on the railway line Liberec–Jaroměř.

== Sights ==
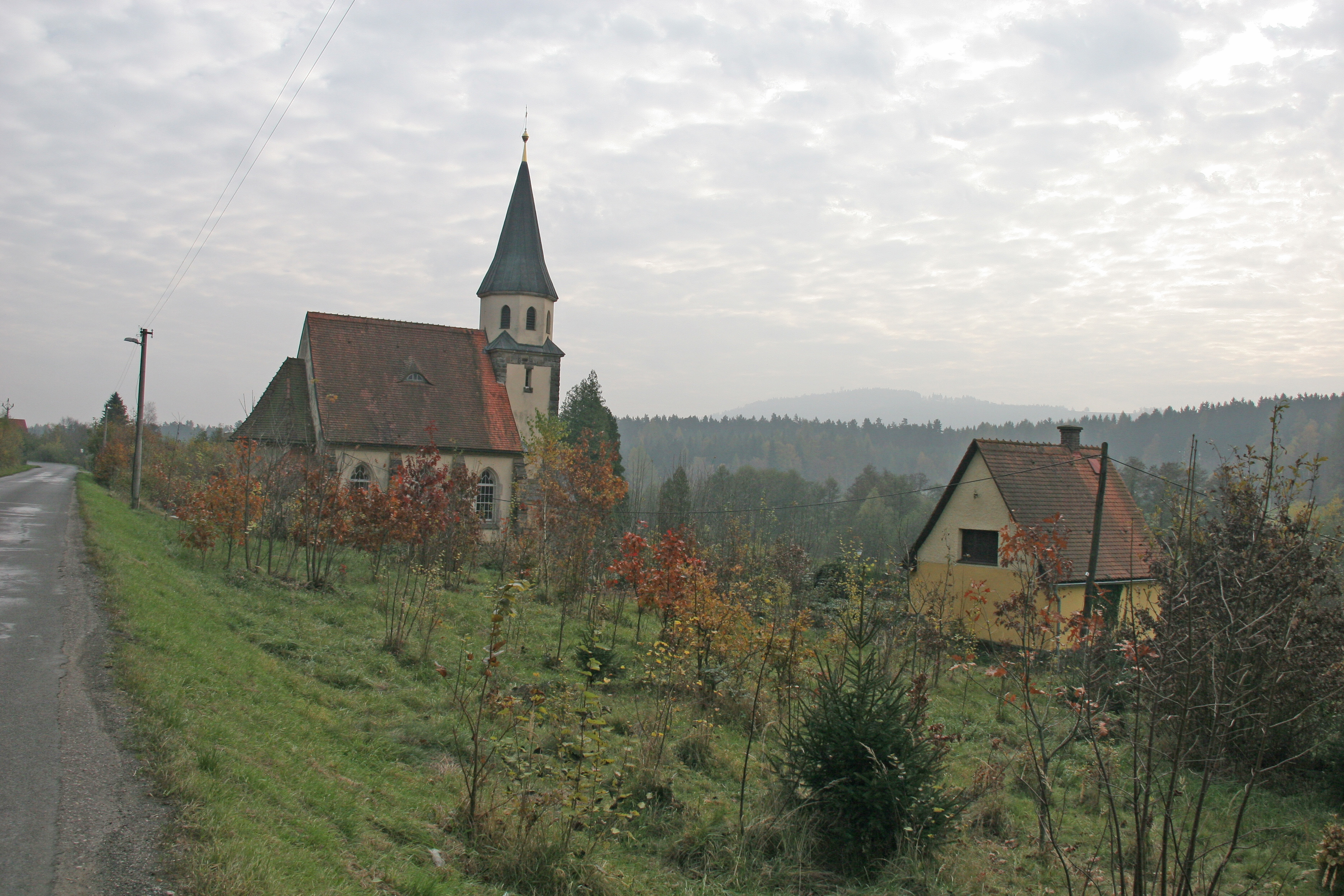
Church of Saint Anne

Among the protected cultural monuments in the municipality are four rural houses from the 19th century, which are among the best-preserved examples of regional folk architecture.

The main landmark of Mostek is the Church of Saint Anne, originally built as a cemetery chapel. It was built in the neo-Gothic style in 1914 and modernised in the 1920s.
