= Mostek (Ústí nad Orlicí District) =

- Municipality
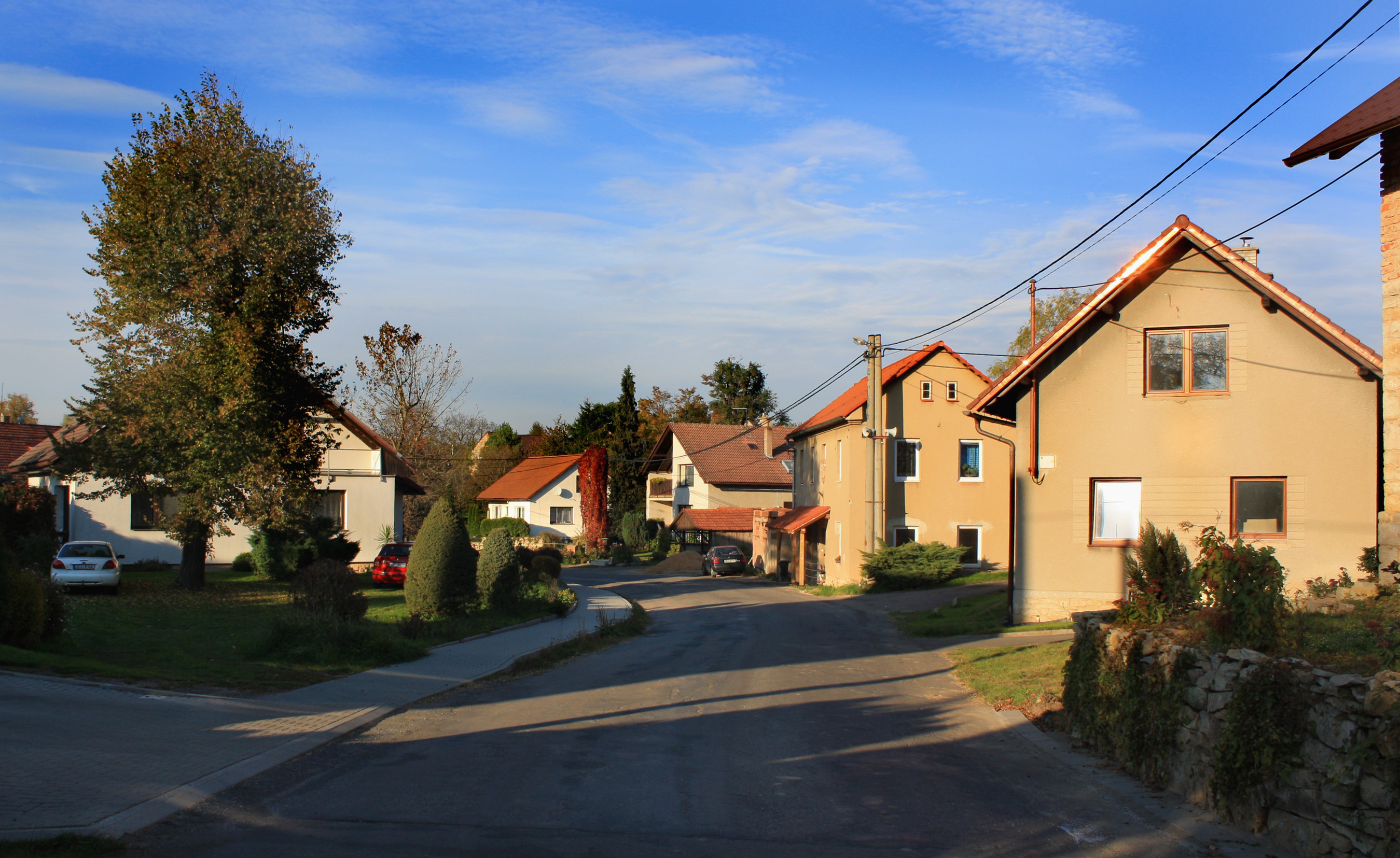
- Central part of Mostek

- Location in the Czech Republic
- Coordinates: 50°0′34″N 16°15′54″E
- Country: Czech Republic
- Region: Pardubice
- District: Ústí nad Orlicí
- First mentioned: 1227

Area
  - Total: 4.69 km^{2} (1.81 sq mi)
- Elevation: 364 m (1,194 ft)

Population (2026-01-01)
  - Total: 280
  - Density: 60/km^{2} (150/sq mi)
- Time zone: UTC+1 (CET)
  - Summer (DST): UTC+2 (CEST)
- Postal code: 565 01
- Website: www.mostek-uo.cz

Mostek is a municipality and village in Ústí nad Orlicí District in the Pardubice Region of the Czech Republic. It has about 300 inhabitants.

Mostek lies approximately 11 kilometres (7 mi) north-west of Ústí nad Orlicí, 35 km (22 mi) east of Pardubice, and 133 km (83 mi) east of Prague.

== Administrative division ==
Mostek consists of two municipal parts (in brackets population according to the 2021 census):

- Mostek (208)
- Sudličkova Lhota (53)

== Demographics ==
Historical population
Year	Pop.	±%
1869	366	—
1880	350	−4.4%
1890	340	−2.9%
1900	320	−5.9%
1910	322	+0.6%
1921	327	+1.6%
1930	335	+2.4%
1950	262	−21.8%
1961	253	−3.4%
1970	218	−13.8%
1980	222	+1.8%
1991	244	+9.9%
2001	230	−5.7%
2011	245	+6.5%
2021	261	+6.5%
Source: Censuses
