= Miechów County =

Miechów County Powiat miechowski
- County
- Flag Coat of arms

- Location within the voivodeship
- Coordinates (Miechów): 50°21′28″N 20°1′57″E
- Country: Poland
- Voivodeship: Lesser Poland
- Seat: Miechów
- Gminas: Total 7: Gmina Charsznica; Gmina Gołcza; Gmina Kozłów; Gmina Książ Wielki; Gmina Miechów; Gmina Racławice; Gmina Słaboszów

Area
  - Total: 676.73 km^{2} (261.29 sq mi)

Population (2019)
  - Total: 48,948
  - Density: 72.330/km^{2} (187.33/sq mi)
  - Urban: 11,612
  - Rural: 37,336
- Car plates: KMI
- Website: www.miechow.pl

Miechów County (Polish: powiat miechowski) is a unit of territorial administration and local government (powiat) in Lesser Poland Voivodeship, southern Poland. It came into being on 1 January 1999, as a result of the Polish local government reforms passed in 1998. Its administrative seat and only town is Miechów, which lies 34 kilometres (21 mi) north of the regional capital Kraków.

The county covers an area of 676.73 square kilometres (261.3 sq mi). As of 2019 its total population is 48,948, out of which the population of Miechów is 11,612 and the rural population is 37,336.

== Neighbouring counties ==
Miechów County is bordered by Jędrzejów County to the north, Pińczów County and Kazimierza County to the east, Proszowice County to the south-east, Kraków County to the south, and Olkusz County and Zawiercie County to the west.

== Administrative division ==
The county is subdivided into seven gminas (one urban-rural and six rural). These are listed in the following table, in descending order of population.

Gmina	Type	Area (km^{2})	Population (2019)	Seat
Gmina Miechów	urban-rural	132.9	19,680	Miechów
Gmina Charsznica	rural	78.3	7,459	Charsznica
Gmina Gołcza	rural	90.3	6,049	Gołcza
Gmina Książ Wielki	urban-rural	137.8	5,098	Książ Wielki
Gmina Kozłów	rural	85.8	4,619	Kozłów
Gmina Słaboszów	rural	77.0	3,526	Słaboszów
Gmina Racławice	rural	59.2	2,517	Racławice
