= Stary Ciepielów and Rekówka massacre =

1942 war crime in Poland

- Location: Stary Ciepielów and Rekówka, occupied Poland
- Date: 6 December 1942
- Incident type: Massacre
- Organizations: Ordnungspolizei
- Victims: 33

The Stary Ciepielów and Rekówka massacre was a Nazi war crime perpetrated by the German Gendarmerie (state rural police) in the villages of Stary Ciepielów and Rekówka within occupied Poland. On 6 December 1942 thirty-one Poles, including women and children, from the families of Kowalski, Kosior, Obuchiewicz and Skoczylas, were murdered for helping Jews. Among the victims were two Jewish refugees. The Stary Ciepielów and Rekówka massacre was one of the most severe crimes inflicted by Nazi-German occupants towards Poles who had helped Jews.

== Prelude ==
After the Nazi occupation of Poland began, the powiat of Iłża became a part of the Radom district of the General Government. In the spring of 1941, German occupational authorities initiated the process of ghettoization of the local Jewish population. During the "Aktion Reinhard", around 10,000 Jews from ghettos in Bałtów, Ciepielów, Lipsko and Solec nad Wisłą were forcibly resettled to the "transit ghetto" in Tarłów. In October 1942, they were deported to the Treblinka extermination camp.

Hundreds of Jews managed to avoid deportation and hide in the nearby forests. Although the occupying Germans had imposed the death penalty as punishment for sheltering Jews, numerous Poles from Ciepielów and Lipsko remained involved in various forms of assistance for Jews in hiding. According to historians Sebastian Piątkowski and Jacek Młynarczyk, these phenomena could be explained by the fact that in this region during the pre-war period there were no significant economic inequalities or competition, and consequently, no serious ethnic tensions between Poles and Jews. Equally importantly, the powiat of Iłża was the stronghold of the left-wing, agrarian Polish People's Party "Wyzwolenie"; the right-wing, anti-Semitic National Democracy never gained any significant support in this region.

Among the Jews hiding in the forests were many young men who started to organize small self-defence groups. The communist military unit Gwardia Ludowa, which wanted to establish footholds in the Iłża region but faced very little support among the Polish population, perceived these groups as the natural reservoir of manpower. Soon the Polish-Jewish partisan unit, led by the Polish communist Stanisław Olczyk ("Garbaty") and the Jewish Chil Brawerman ("Baca"), was organized. Though the unit had no serious military significance, local Nazi authorities became anxious and decided to organize a wide-range round-up in the forests. The action started on the morning of 29 November 1942 and lasted until 3 or 6 December. German Gendarmerie (state rural police) liquidated three forest camps and killed around 120 Jewish refugees, including ethnic Poles. The Olczyk and Brawerman's unit managed to break out from the encirclement but sustained heavy losses.

It is most likely that German policemen forced some Jews who were caught during the round-up to reveal the names of Polish families who supported them. However, it is also possible that those families were betrayed by other Poles. In consequence, Nazi authorities decided to conduct demonstrative repressive action with the aim to intimidate the local population and discourage Poles from providing any help to the Jews. This task was entrusted to the subunit from 1st Motorized Gendarmerie Battalion which had its post in the folwark in Górki Ciepielowskie.

At that time, several families from Stary Ciepielów and neighbouring Rekówka sheltered Jewish refugees. Among them were Piotr and Helena Obuchiewicz from Stary Ciepielów who hid in their farm a Jewish hat-maker from Ciepielów of unknown identity. Their neighbours, the Kosior family, sheltered two Jewish men. In Rekówka two families, Kosior and Skoczylas, sheltered in their shared farm firstly two Jewish women from Ciepielów and later four Jewish men. Polish families also provided other Jews with one-time shelter and food aid.

To some extent, Jews and their Polish helpers were aware of the danger. Around 4 December 1942 a Jewish woman came to the out-of-the-way farm of Jan Rusin in Stary Ciepielów and asked the owner to warn the families who helped Jews that Germans may come to arrest them. Some witnesses claimed that shortly before the German action, the Jews who were hiding in the village left their shelters in Polish houses and fled either to the forest or to the neighbouring villages. None of these actions prevented the ensuing tragedy.

== The massacre ==
=== Stary Ciepielów ===
In the early morning of 6 December 1942 around 20 German gendarmes came to Stary Ciepielów. They went first to the farm of Antoni Sochaj, on the outskirts of the village, and ordered him to show them the farms of Adam Kowalski and Piotr Obuchiewicz. Immediately after Sochaj complied, they surrounded both farms and the farm of Władysław Kosior. In Kowalski's farm, they caught the owner, his wife and five children, in Obuchiewicz's farm – the owner, his wife and four children, in Kosior's farm – the owner, his wife and six children. Only the teenage son of Kowalski, Jan, who at that time worked in the neighbouring village as a tailor's apprentice, avoided capture.

Most probably, the gendarmes conducted a thorough search of all three farms. It is unknown what they found in Kowalski's and Obuchiewicz's premises; however, it is certain that at Kosior's farm they captured two Jewish men and found books written in Yiddish and Hebrew. According to some witnesses, both Jews came to Kosior's house after it was surrounded by the Germans. It is unlikely that looking from their hideouts in the nearby forest they did not realize that gendarmes were present in the village, so it is possible that they voluntarily surrendered in hope that in this way they would save their benefactors. In the meantime, the gendarmes ordered the sołtys (village head) Jan Mirowski to go to neighbouring Rekówka and bring Stanisław Kosior (a relative of Władysław Kosior from Stary Ciepielów). However, along the way Mirowski met the officer who was in charge of the action. (Note: Name of this officer is unknown. According to the witnesses, he had the rank of lieutenant and was around thirty-year-old. His fellow gendarmes called him "Karl". See: Młynarczyk, Piątkowski (2007), p. 92.) He cancelled the previous order and told Mirowski to return home.

For a few hours, gendarmes only guarded their detainees and took no other action, even allowing Adam Kowalski to feed his livestock. The situation changed dramatically in the early afternoon. Around 13:00, the Kosior family along with captured Jews were taken out from their house and rushed to the barn. The gendarmes shot all of them and set the building on fire. One of the Kosior sons, probably only slightly wounded, managed to get out of the barn. He bypassed the German cordon and ran across the field. The gendarmes pursued him by car, caught the boy, and threw him into the burning building. After the execution, they looted the farm.

When the looting was completed, the gendarmes joined their colleagues who guarded the Kowalski and Obuchiewicz families. The house of the latter was chosen as the next site of execution since it was located at some distance from the neighbouring farmhouses, so there was no risk that fire would spread across the village. Adam Kowalski and his family were removed from their house and rushed to the Obuchiewicz house. Germans shot both families and set the building on fire. Probably a few injured children were burnt alive. Sixteen-year-old Janina Kowalska managed to get out of the building. However, after running a few meters, she was shot. Her dead body was later thrown into the fire. When the flames began to fade, the gendarmes returned to their post in Górki Ciepielowskie.

=== Rekówka ===
At the same time, when the first German unit arrived at Stary Ciepielów, around 10 gendarmes came to neighbouring Rekówka. They were led by a non-commissioned officer named Bierner (he was an Austrian from Vienna). The gendarmes went first to the sołtys of Rekówka and ordered him to show the farm which was inhabited by the two related families: Kosior and Skoczylas. Then they surrounded the farm and detained all Poles who were there. When the Germans came, Piotr Skoczylas, his two sons and older daughter were not present in the house. However, the gendarmes captured Piotr's mother-in-law, Marianna Kiścińska, his younger daughter Leokadia and ten-year-old Henryka Kordula – Leokadia's friend from a neighbouring farm. Also, Stanisław Kosior, his wife and four of their children were among the detained. Gendarmes searched the farm and found books which belonged to the Jewish refugees who were supported by the Skoczylas family.

Bierner was going to send a group of his men in search of Piotr Skoczylas and the rest of his children. However, before they left the farm one of Piotr's sons, Józef, came back from the local dairy. He was beaten, threatened with a gun and then taken by two gendarmes to search for his father. On one of the neighbouring farms, Józef accidentally met his younger brother Jan. His German escort did not recognize Jan, nevertheless, they assumed that he must know Skoczylas's family, so they ordered him to go with them and help identify Piotr. When they reached the Tymienica Stara, Józef escaped. However, in the same village gendarmes found and arrested his father.

In the meantime a few gendarmes came to Rekówka by car and ordered Bierner and his men to immediately execute all detained Poles. Nine people were taken out from the house. The eight-year-old son of the Kosiors, Mieczysław, tried to escape, but he was shot on the spot. Other Poles were executed in the barn. According to the witnesses another son of Kosior, probably Jan, tried to escape but after he ran around 200 meters he was shot. Tomasz Kordula tried to save his daughter, but he was beaten and driven away by one of the gendarmes.

Before the execution was finished, two gendarmes came back from Tymienica Stara with Piotr and Jan Skoczylas. Still unaware that Jan was Piotr's son, they ordered the young man to go away and then took Piotr to the barn and shot him. Before they left, they looted the farm and set fire to the barn.

=== Victims ===
On 6 December 1942 German gendarmes from the post in Górki Ciepielowskie murdered 33 people in Stary Ciepielów and Rekówka, including 31 Poles and two Jews. Among the victims were twenty minors below the age of 18 years. The youngest victim was 7 months old, and the oldest around 70 years old.

The list of the victims, based on the monograph of Jacek Młynarczyk and Sebastian Piątkowski from 2007, and the index Represje za pomoc Żydom na okupowanych ziemiach polskich w czasie II wojny światowej ("Repressions for helping Jews in the occupied Polish lands during World War II") published by Institute of National Remembrance in 2019:

Victims murdered in Stary Ciepielów
Kowalski family	Kosior family	Obuchiewicz family	Others
Adam (47 y/o)	Władysław (42 y/o)	Piotr (52 y/o)	Unidentified Jewish male
Bronisława (40 y/o)	Karolina (Note: In some older sources her name is spelled "Katarzyna".) (40 y/o)	Helena (35 y/o)	Unidentified Jewish male
Janina (16 y/o)	Aleksander (18 y/o)	Władysław (Note: Some older sources call him with female name "Władysława".) (6 y/o)	
Zofia (12 y/o)	Tadeusz (16 y/o)	Zofia (4 y/o)	
Stefan (6 y/o)	Władysław (14 y/o)	Janina (2 y/o)	
Henryk (4 y/o)	Mieczysław (12 y/o)	Boy of unknown name (6 m/o)	
Tadeusz (1 y/o)	Irena (10 y/o)		
	Adam (6 y/o)		

Victims murdered in Rekówka
Skoczylas family	Kosior family	Others
Piotr	Stanisław (40 y/o)	Henryka Kordula (10 y/o)
Leokadia (12 y/o)	Zofia (Note: Some older sources claim that her name was "Maria" or "Marianna" and she was 27-year-old.) (40 y/o)	
Marianna Kiścińska (Note: In some older sources her surname is spelled "Kościńska".) (70 y/o)	Jan (10 y/o)	
	Mieczysław (8 y/o)	
	Marian (4 y/o)	
	Teresa (2 y/o)	

== Aftermath ==
In the evening of 6 December, the interpreter from the Gendarmerie post in Górki Ciepielowskie visited the sołtys of Stary Ciepielów and ordered him to bury the victims of the massacre. According to the German order, bodies were not to be buried at the cemetery but in mass graves near the victim's farms. The sołtys of Rekówka received the same order.

Jan Kowalski, the only surviving member of the Kowalski family, had to hide for a long time after the massacre.

The Stary Ciepielów and Rekówka massacre was the largest, but not the only, execution conducted by the Gendarmerie unit from Górki Ciepielowskie during the pacification operation in the Ciepielów region. On 7 December the gendarmes raided the village of Świesielice and executed fourteen Poles, among them women and children, suspected of aiding the partisans. The next day they came again to the village and murdered a Polish woman named Marianna Skwira who along with her husband was helping the Jewish refugees. Finally, on 11 January 1943, in the village of Zajączków, the gendarmes executed six Poles who were suspected of aiding the Jews. Among the victims were Stanisława Wołowiec, her four daughters, her brother-in-law and her farmhand.

The massacre shocked the local population and resulted in fewer attempts to help the Jews. The local people became even less keen to offer assistance after Chil Brawerman's group killed three Poles wrongly accused of collaboration with the Germans. As a result, the vast majority of Jews hiding in the forests around Ciepielów did not survive the war. In Ciepielów itself, the only Jewish survivor was Dawid Sankowicz, who was sheltered by Polish shoemaker Stanisław Lewandowski until the last day of German occupation.

The Stary Ciepielów and Rekówka massacre, along with the following executions in Świesielice and Zajączków, was one of the greatest crimes committed by Nazi-German occupants on Poles who had helped Jews. None of the perpetrators were brought to justice.

== Remembrance ==
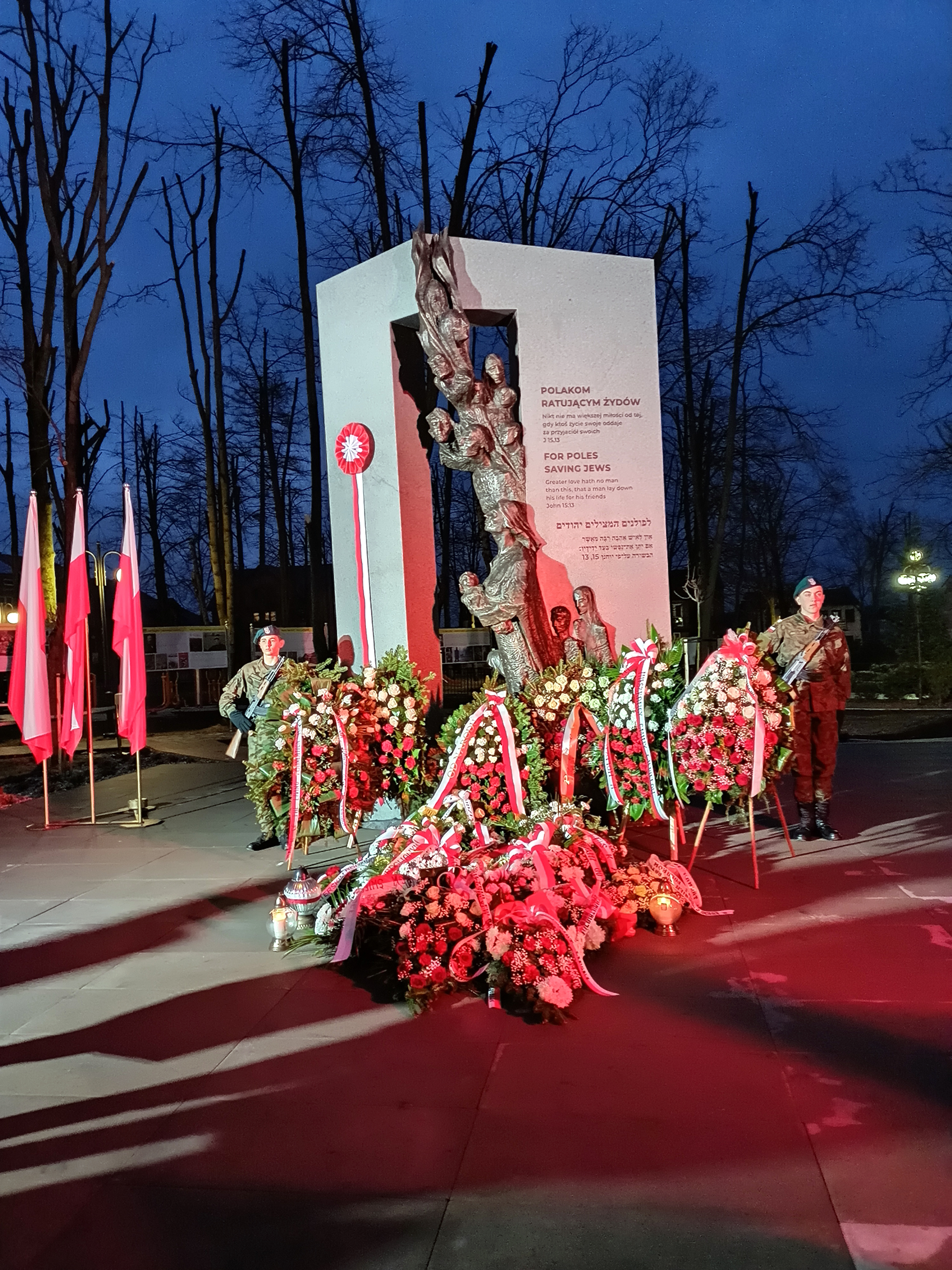
Monument to Poles Rescuing Jews in Ciepielów

After the war, the remains of the people murdered during the massacre were exhumed and buried in the mass grave of the victims of German terror, located in Stary Ciepielów (close to the road leading to Tymienica Stara).

The story of the Polish families from Stary Ciepielów and Rekówka murdered for helping Jews was depicted in the 2009 Polish docudrama Historia Kowalskich (en. "The Story of the Kowalski Family"), directed by Arkadiusz Gołębiewski and Maciej Pawlicki.

On 19 October 2009 members of the Kowalski, Kosior, Obuchiewicz and Skoczylas families were posthumously awarded the Order of Polonia Restituta Third Class by the Polish president Lech Kaczyński.

In March 2012 the Kowalski family, along with two other Polish families murdered by Nazi-German occupants for helping Jews, (Note: Ulma family from Markowa and Baranek family from Siedliska.) was commemorated by commemorative coins issued by the National Bank of Poland.

On 24 March 2025, a memorial to honor the murdered Poles was unveiled in Ciepielów.

== See also ==
- Ciepielów massacre

== Bibliography ==
- Bartoszewski, Władysław; Lewinówna, Zofia (2007). Ten jest z ojczyzny mojej. Polacy z pomocą Żydom 1939–1945 (in Polish). Warszawa: Świat Książki. ISBN 978-83-247-0715-7.
- Datner, Szymon (1968). Las sprawiedliwych. Karta z dziejów ratownictwa Żydów w okupowanej Polsce (in Polish). Warszawa: Książka i Wiedza.
- Grądzka-Rejak, Martyna; Namysło, Aleksandra (2019). Represje za pomoc Żydom na okupowanych ziemiach polskich w czasie II wojny światowej (in Polish). Vol. I. Warszawa: Instytut Pamięci Narodowej. ISBN 978-83-8098-667-1.
- Krakowski, Shmuel (1984). The War of the Doomed: Jewish Armed Resistance in Poland, 1942–1944. New York & London: Holmes & Meier Publishers. ISBN 978-0-8419-0851-2.
- Kucharczak, Przemysław (9 December 2007). "Życie za Żyda". Gość Niedzielny (in Polish).
- Młynarczyk, Jacek Andrzej; Piątkowski, Sebastian (2007). Cena poświęcenia. Zbrodnie na Polakach za pomoc udzielaną Żydom w rejonie Ciepielowa (in Polish). Kraków: Instytut Studiów Strategicznych. ISBN 978-83-87832-62-9.
- Piątkowski, Sebastian (2009). "Zbrodnie żandarmów z posterunku w Lipsku nad Wisłą na Polakach udzielających pomocy Żydom (1942–1943)". In Namysło, Aleksandra (ed.). "Kto w takich czasach Żydów przechowuje?...": Polacy niosący pomoc ludności żydowskiej w okresie okupacji niemieckiej (in Polish). Warszawa: Instytut Pamięci Narodowej. ISBN 978-83-7629-043-0.
