= Radom Ghetto =

Nazi ghetto in occupied Poland

The Radom Ghetto
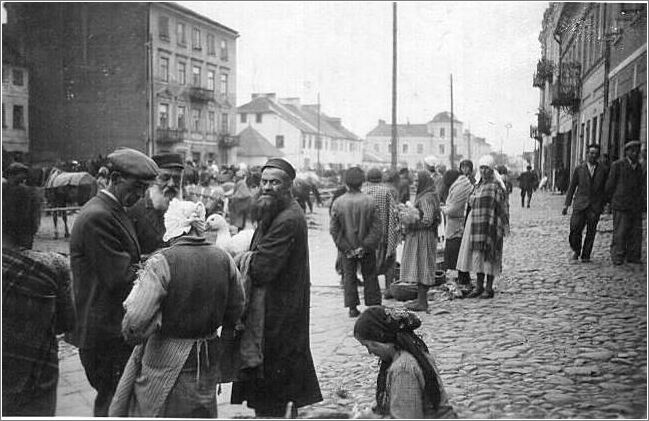
- Street in the Radom Ghetto, c. 1940–1941

- Location of Radom Ghetto in World War II, west of Majdanek concentration camp

- Location of Radom in Poland today
- Location: Radom, German-occupied Poland; 51.24°N 21.10°E
- Incident type: Imprisonment, mass shooting, forced labor, starvation, deportations to death camps
- Perpetrators: SS, Order Police battalions
- Victims: 33,000 Jews

The Radom Ghetto was a Nazi ghetto set up in March 1941 in the city of Radom during the Nazi occupation of Poland, for the purpose of persecution and exploitation of Polish Jews. It was closed off from the outside officially in April 1941. A year and a half later, the liquidation of the ghetto began in August 1942, and ended in July 1944, with approximately 30,000–32,000 victims (men, women and children) deported aboard Holocaust trains to their deaths at the Treblinka extermination camp.

== Background ==
In the invasion of Poland, the city of Radom was overrun by the German forces on 8 September 1939. The total population was 81,000 at that time of which 25,000 were Jewish. On 30 November 1939 the SS-Gruppenführer Fritz Katzmann from Selbstschutz who led the murder operations earlier in Wrocław, and in Katowice, was appointed the SS and Police Leader (SSPF) of occupied Radom. His arrival was followed by wanton violence and plunder for personal gain. Katzmann ordered the execution of Jewish leaders right away. Before the creation of a ghetto, many Jews were pressed into forced labor. One of their first tasks on German orders was to rebuild the prewar Polish Łucznik Arms Factory damaged in the attack, to meet the German military needs. The factory served as the major local Nazi employer throughout the war.

The Germans forced the Jewish community to pay contributions, and seized their valuables and businesses. Nevertheless, the precious metal holdings were already depleted because the Radom Jews – especially the Jewish women from "Wizo" – made massive donations to Polish air-force fund for months before the invasion. Even the least fortunate Jews purchased air-defense bonds with pride until May 1939.

Soon after the invasion, around September–October 1939, the SS conducted surprise raids on synagogues. The worshipers were dragged out and put into labour commandos. The Radom Synagogue was desecrated by the Nazis and its furnishings destroyed. To instill fear, the Jewish city councilor Jojna (Yona) Zylberberg was marched with a stone over his head and beaten by the SS soldiers. His wife died in an accident at home only months earlier by falling out of a window when she tried to hang sheers, leaving her two children behind. Around December 1939 – January 1940 the Judenrat was established to serve as an intermediary organization between the German command and the local Jewish community. One thousand men were sent to labour camps of the Lublin reservation in the summer of 1940. In December, the German Governor-General Hans Frank stationing in Kraków ordered the expulsion of 10,000 Jews from the city. Only 1,840 were deported due to technical difficulties. In the spring of 1941 there were about 32,000 Jews in Radom. Katzmann remained there until Operation Barbarossa.

== Ghetto history ==
The city of Radom received Jews expelled from other locations in Poland including the Jewish inmates of the Kraków Ghetto because Kraków – according to the wishes of Gauleiter Hans Frank – was to become the "racially cleanest" city of the General Government territory to serve as its German capital. The Governor-General Frank issued an order to create Radom ghetto in March 1941. A week earlier the Jewish Ghetto Police was formed by the new Nazi administration to aid with the relocations. The Jews were given ten days in which to vacate their prewar homes and settle within the ghetto zone along with their families. The area was split in two like in many other Polish cities. The ghetto gates were closed from the outside on 7 April 1941. About 33,000 Polish Jews were gathered there; 27,000 at the main ghetto, and about 5,000 at a smaller ghetto in the suburb. Most of the ghetto area was not walled; the barriers were formed by the buildings themselves and the exits were managed by Jewish and Polish police. The "large ghetto" was set up at Wałowa street in central Śródmieście District and the "small ghetto" at the Glinice District.

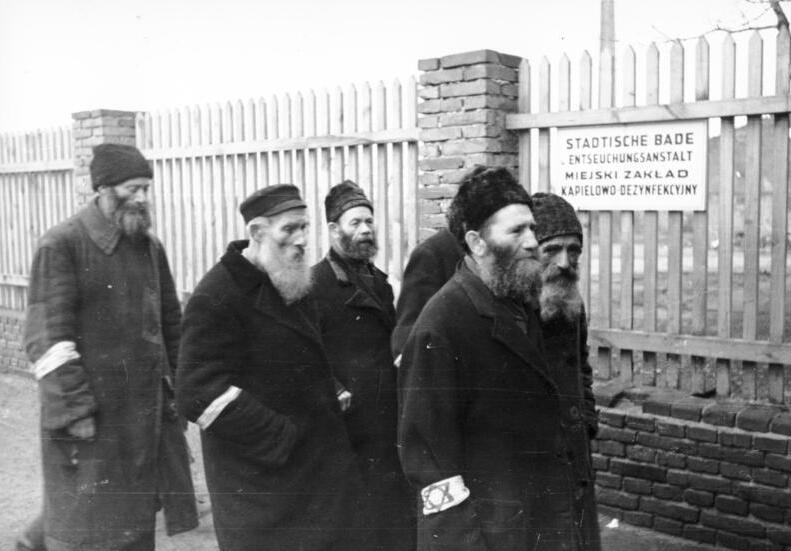
Jewish men with armbands in the Radom Ghetto, March 1941

As with many other ghettos across occupied Poland, starvation was not uncommon. The German-allotted rations for a person in the ghetto were 100 grams (3.5 oz) of bread per day. Nonetheless, the conditions in the Radom Ghetto were on average better than in many other contemporary ghettos in Nazi-occupied Europe.

In the first months of 1942 the Germans carried out several actions, arresting or summarily executing various leaders of the Jewish community. The Germans began to liquidate the Radom Ghetto in earnest, starting in August 1942 as part of Operation Reinhard. The first large deportation emptied the smaller Glinice ghetto. The Germans were aided by the Polish Blue Police units, and "Hiwis". By the end of August approximately 2,000 Jews remained in Radom. The deported Jews were sent to extermination camps (primarily Treblinka and Auschwitz). The remnants of the Radom ghetto were turned into a temporary labor camp. The last Radom Jews were evicted in June 1944, when on June 26 the last inhabitants were deported to Auschwitz. Only a few hundred Jews from Radom survived the war.

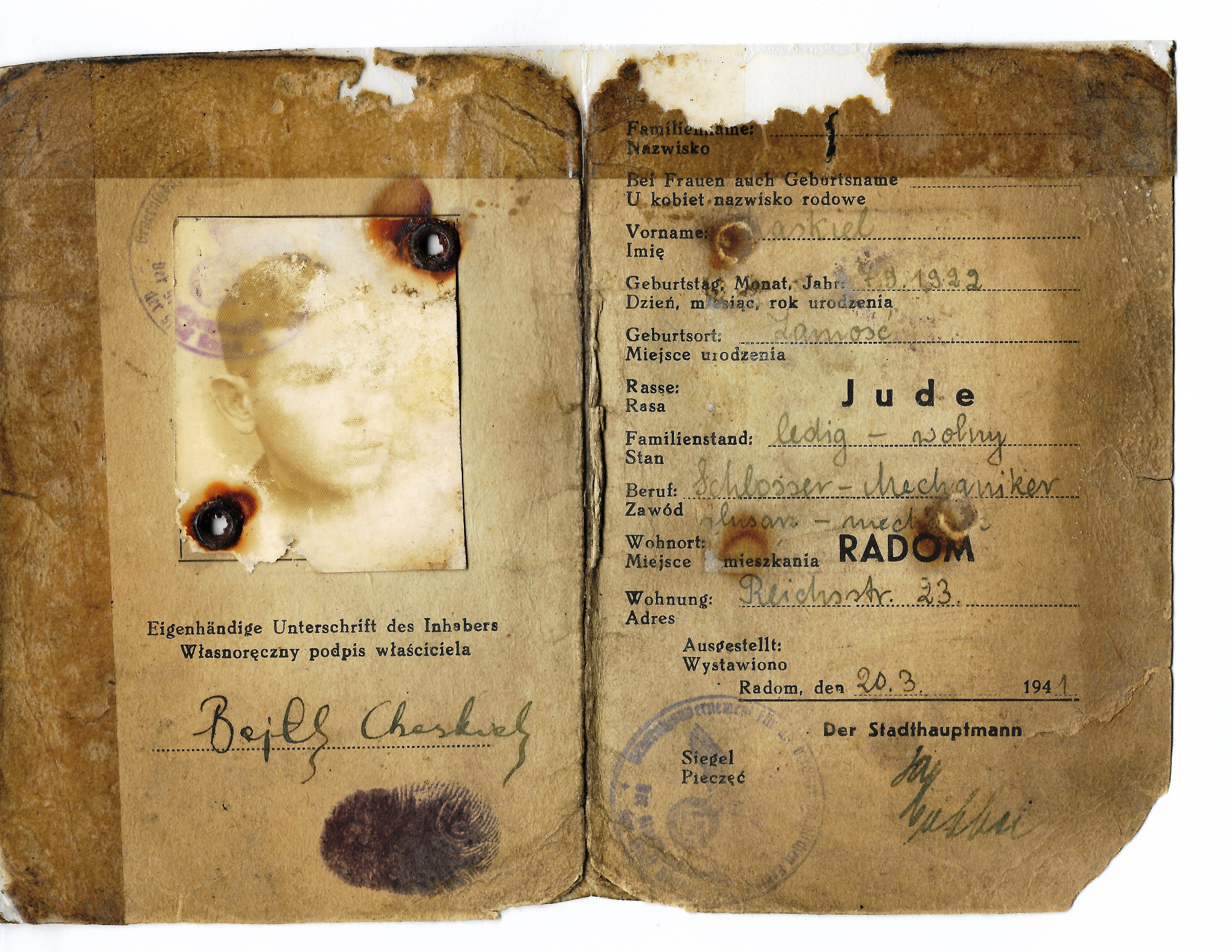
1941 Radom issued Jewish ID card from the German occupation of Poland

=== Escape and rescue ===
Among the Polish rescuers of Jews, the most prominent role belonged to Dr. Jerzy Borysowicz, director of the mental hospital in Radom located at Warszawska Street. The facility was spared by the Nazis only because the former church building could not be turned into any war-related purpose. The Jews, including children, were receiving daily help from Borysowicz as well as his medical staff in total secrecy. The most dramatic was the rescue of people suffering in the ghetto from the typhoid fever. Borysowicz treated Mordechai Anielewicz, leader of the Jewish Combat Organization instrumental in engineering the Warsaw Ghetto Uprising. Most of his patients however, did not survive the Holocaust. Anielewicz died in the Uprising. Borysowicz was awarded the title of Righteous among the Nations posthumously, in 1984, four years after his death on 5 June 1980.

Among those Poles who were murdered by the Nazis for saving Jews was 60-years-old Adam Rafałowicz living in Radom, shot on 18 September 1942 for rendering help to a Jew; There were more such murders in the Radom county. A group of villagers from around Ciepielów near Radom including Piotr Skoczylas and his eight-year-old daughter Leokadia were burned alive by a police battalion on 6 December 1942 for sheltering Jews. On the same day, another barn full of people was set on fire in nearby Rekówka, and 33 Poles saving Jews were burned alive including the families of Obuchiewicz, Kowalski, and 14 Kosiors. Roman Jan Szafranski, age 64, living in Radom with his wife Jadwiga, were caught sheltering a Jewish girl, Anna Kerc (born in 1937); the girl was killed, he was sent to Gross-Rosen concentration camp where he perished. His wife was sent to Ravensbruck but survived.

== See also ==
- The Holocaust in occupied Poland
- Timeline of Treblinka
- List of Jewish ghettos in German-occupied Poland
