= Siedliska massacre =

The Siedliska massacre was a Nazi war crime perpetrated by the Sonderdienst and German Gendarmerie (state rural police) in the village of Siedliska within occupied Poland. On March 15, 1943, five members of the Baranek family were executed for helping Jews. Also, four Jewish refugees were murdered with them.

== Prelude ==
Wincenty Baranek was a prosperous Polish farmer from Siedliska within Miechów County. He lived in a farm in the central part of the village, along with his wife, two sons and stepmother. Sometime after the Nazi occupation of Poland began, he was appointed a head of the local Village Watch. However, at the end of 1942, he agreed to hide five Jewish men in his farm. Those refugees were probably the Gottfrieds (or Goldfingers) – a family of father and sons from Miechów. According to the Yad Vashem: "They would undoubtedly not have been able to pay anything for their rescue, being poor tailors following a long stay in the ghetto".

It is not certain who informed the German authorities that Baranek sheltered Jews. Many sources indicate Bolesław Falencki as the primary suspect. Falencki was a soldier of the Home Army (Armia Krajowa, AK) who was engaged in forging an identity documents for Jewish refugees and those members of the Underground who were exposed and pursued by the Gestapo. He was a friend of Wincenty Baranek, and it is possible that he was the one, who convinced him to shelter the Jews. On March 13, 1943, Falencki was arrested by the Gestapo. After severe tortures, he agreed to testify and gave up a dozen of members of the AK. It is possible that he also revealed, that Baranek is sheltering Jews. Falencki was later deported to the Auschwitz concentration camp, but he survived. He was tried in Kraków in 1947–1948, but the court acquitted him of the charge of betraying Baranek's family. It was possible because of the testimony of Jakub Bochner, a Holocaust survivor. However, Bochner was saved by Falencki during the war, so the credibility of his testimony might be questioned.

According to the witnesses testimonies, both the Polish family, and the refugees, were not particularly cautious, so many villagers were well aware that Jews were hiding in the Baranek's farm. Consequently, it cannot be excluded that the family was betrayed by one of their neighbors.

== The massacre ==
In the early morning of March 15, 1943, around 5–6 members of the Sonderdienst came to Siedliska. They were accompanied by the German Gendarme from the post in neighboring Zagorzyce, named Neumann. One of the Germans went to the sołtys (village head) Piotr Regucki and ordered him to gather local men near the Wincenty Baranek's farm. At the same time, other Germans surrounded the farm. When the men summoned by the sołtys reported, the policemen ordered them to remove a straw stored in the attics of the house and farm buildings. Contrary to their expectations, villagers did not find any Jewish refugee in the attic. Then, the Germans ordered the men to gather on the farmyard and started searching on their own. Shortly afterward, they found a hideout located somewhere between the house and farm buildings. A Jewish man was dragged out of the hideout, taken to the vicinity of a well, and shot. Next, the Germans ordered the villagers to leave the farm, while they continued the search. Soon, they found another three Jews, whom they shot on the spot. They did not find the fifth refugee, who probably left the farm in the previous night.

When all the Jews were found and killed, the policemen went to the Baranek house, where they began a brutal interrogation of the owner (also, they drank a large amount of the alcohol). When the interrogation was finished, Wincenty and his wife Łucja were taken to the barn and shot. Soon, the men of the Sonderdienst drag out from the house two sons of the couple, nine-year-old Tadeusz and thirteen-year-old Henryk. They were ordered to kneel near the gate to the barn, and then they were shot in the back of their heads.

Wincenty's stepmother, Katarzyna Baranek née Kopeć, survived the first phase of the massacre. Due to her small figure she was able to hide behind the furnace. However, before leaving the village, the Germans ordered local men to find Katarzyna and bring her to the gendarmerie post in Miechów. They threatened, if the order will not be followed within 24 hours, a forty of local Poles will be executed. On the next day, the terrified villagers brought Katarzyna to Miechów where she was murdered by the gendarmes.

The policemen ordered local farmers to bury the corpses of murdered Jews near the Baranek's barn. German authorities agreed Wincenty, Łucja and their sons to be buried in the local cemetery, but without a funeral ceremony. At the same cemetery, but in a separate grave, Katarzyna Kopeć-Baranek was buried.

== Remembrance ==
On November 8, 2013, Wincenty Baranek, Łucja Baranek and Katarzyna Kopeć-Baranek were posthumously awarded by the Polish president Bronisław Komorowski with the Order of Polonia Restituta Third Class.

On July 3, 2012, Yad Vashem recognized Wincenty and Łucja Baranek and Katarzyna Kopeć-Baranek as Righteous Among the Nations, and on December 24, 2012, Tadeusz and Henryk Baranek were recognized as well.

In March 2012, the Baranek family, along with two other Polish families murdered by Nazi-German occupants for helping Jews, (Note: Ulma family from Markowa and Kowalski family from Stary Ciepielów.) was commemorated by commemorative coins issued by the National Bank of Poland.

== Bibliography ==
- Bartoszewski, Władysław; Lewinówna, Zofia (2007). Ten jest z ojczyzny mojej. Polacy z pomocą Żydom 1939–1945 (in Polish). Warszawa: Świat Książki. ISBN 978-83-247-0715-7.
- Namysło, Aleksandra; Berendt, Grzegorz (2014). Rejestr faktów represji na obywatelach polskich za pomoc ludności żydowskiej w okresie II wojny światowej (in Polish). Warszawa: Instytut Pamięci Narodowej & Instytut Studiów Strategicznych. ISBN 978-83-7629-669-2.
- Samsonowska, Krystyna (2009). "Zamordowanie rodziny Baranków z Siedlisk koło Miechowa". In Namysło, Aleksandra (ed.). "Kto w takich czasach Żydów przechowuje?...": Polacy niosący pomoc ludności żydowskiej w okresie okupacji niemieckiej (in Polish). Warszawa: Instytut Pamięci Narodowej. ISBN 978-83-7629-043-0.
