= Maria Rogozińska =

- Died: 12 January 1943; Pilica, General Government
- Cause of death: killed by Germans for hiding Jews
- Occupation: farmer
- Children: Maria, Helena, Piotr
- Honours: Righteous Among the Nations

Maria Rogozińska née Leśniak (d. 12 January 1943 in Pilica) was a Polish farmer, living in the village of Wierbka near Pilica, together with her three-year-old son. She was murdered by the Germans for hiding Jews and was posthumously awarded the "Righteous Among the Nations" medal.

== Biography ==
Rogozińska lived in the village of Wierbka in the Olkusz county (present Zawiercie county). After her husband's death, she raised three children alone - daughters Maria and Helena (born around 1932 and 1934) and a son named Piotr (born around 1940).

During the German occupation, she hid Jews and members of the resistance movement. There is some contradictory information regarding the number of people who benefited from her assistance. It is certain that an old Jewish woman named Berlińska vel Berlicka vel Perlińska (owner of a mill in Maleszyn) and a young Jewish man of unknown name were hiding on the Rogozińska's farm. However, testimonies from other witnesses indicate that Rogozińska could have been hiding up to four or five Jews.

It is unknown how the information about the Jews hiding on the Rogozińska's farm reached the Germans. Maria was disliked in the village, hence Krystyna Samsonowska's suspicion that she might have been a victim of a denunciation or an accidental deconspiracy on behalf of one of her neighbors, who were in conflict with her.

Around 11 January 1943, German gendarmerie arrived at the Rogozińska's farm. During the search, the Germans discovered two Jews whom they had shot near the house. Two Poles were also killed, Piotr Sendra vel Sender and Piotr Podgórski, who at the time of the gendarmes' arrival were on the farm. During these events, Maria and her children were away from home. The mother and her son were visiting her brother in Maleszyn, while the two older girls were under the care of their neighbours.

Rogozińska, warned by her daughters, did not return to her family home. The execution that took place on her farm, however, terrified the villagers to such an extent that nobody agreed to accept the endangered family under their roof. Finally, the woman left her daughters at the factory in Wierbka, and then went with her son to the farm. She was captured the same evening in unclear circumstances. After a night spent in the village mayor's house, Maria and her son were taken to the gendarmerie headquarters at the Pilica Castle. The Germans subjected her to a brutal interrogation[3], Maria's three-year-old son Peter was tortured in front of her eyes. After the interrogation, Maria and Piotr were shot in the castle moat. Her body was buried in the Pilica cemetery.

On 23 May 2004 she was posthumously awarded the medal "Righteous Among the Nations".
