= Ciepielów, Masovian Voivodeship =

Ciepielów
- Town
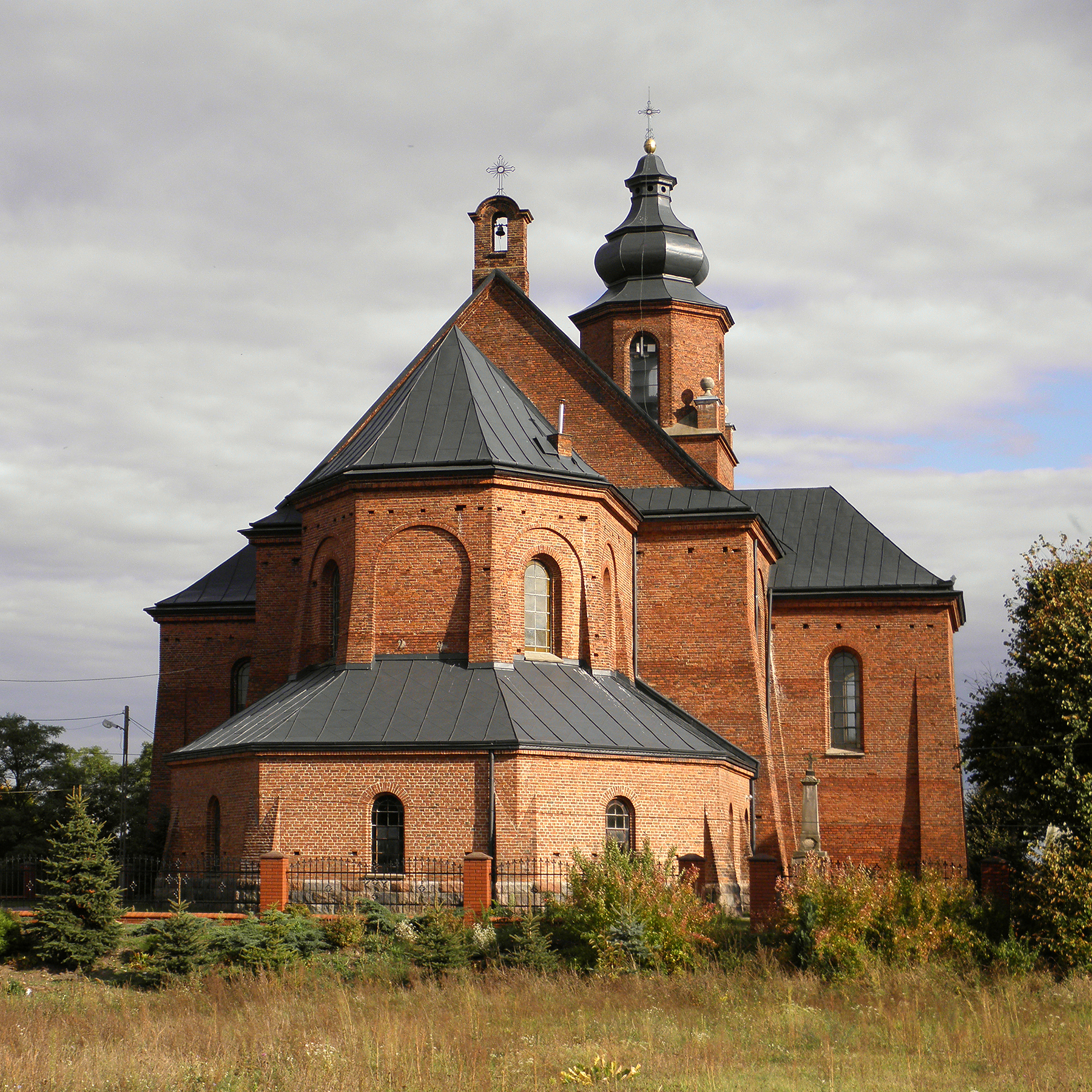
- Church of the Exaltation of the Holy Cross

- Coat of arms

- Location within Poland
- Coordinates: 51°15′N 21°35′E
- Country: Poland
- Voivodeship: Masovian
- County: Lipsko
- Gmina: Ciepielów
- Town rights: 1548

Population
  - Total: 770
- Time zone: UTC+1 (CET)
  - Summer (DST): UTC+2 (CEST)
- Vehicle registration: WLI

Ciepielów [t͡ɕɛˈpjɛluf] is a town in Poland, in the southern part of the Mazovian Voivodeship. It is a capital of a gmina in the Lipsko County, on the Iłżanka River, near Radom. In 1998 it had approximately 750 inhabitants and two minor construction materials plants. Ciepielów belongs to the historic region of Lesser Poland.

== History ==
Ciepielów was founded by the Kazanowski family on the old trade route linking Sandomierz with Warsaw, at the ford at Iłżanka River, as the central point of their domain. Rotmistrz Marcin Kazanowski in 1548 was awarded by King Sigismund II Augustus the right to grant the village with a town charter. Initially it was named Grzymałów after the Grzymała coat of arms of the Kazanowski family. In 1597 the town was granted with Magdeburg Law by King Sigismund III Vasa and was allowed for creation of craft guilds, which allowed it to become a notable centre of commerce in the area. However, before 1627 the town was totally destroyed by a major fire and Zygmunt Kazanowski relocated the town around that date. The town was also granted with a royal privilege of organization of markets once a week and fairs four times a year. In addition, Ciepielów was freed of all taxes and fees for 20 years, which allowed for a faster reconstruction. Ciepielów was a private town, administratively located in the Radom County in the Sandomierz Voivodeship in the Lesser Poland Province of Poland.

Around 1770 Ciepielów was purchased by the Denhoff family and by 1780 it was transferred to Józef Karczewski, starost of Liw. After the Third Partition of Poland, in 1795, it was annexed by Austria. After the Polish victory in the Austro-Polish War of 1809, it became part of the short-lived Duchy of Warsaw, and then it became part of Russian-controlled Congress Poland in 1815. Until 1869 it had town rights and was a minor centre of trade and commerce in the area. However, the town charter was withdrawn as a repression against local inhabitants who took part in the failed January Uprising against Russia. After World War I, in 1918, Poland regained independence and control of Ciepielów.

=== World War II ===
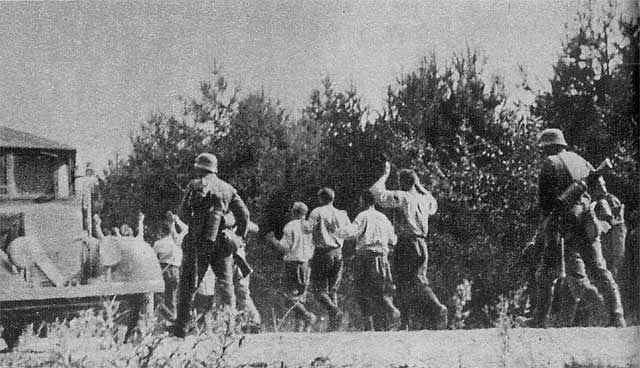
Polish POWs and German soldiers shortly before the Ciepielów massacre

On September 8, 1939, during the invasion of Poland, the village of Dąbrowa (near Ciepielów) was the site of a mass murder of over 250 Polish prisoners of war by German Wehrmacht troops. In December 1941, a minor ghetto was established in Ciepielów by German authorities; in October 1942 all of them (approximately 600) of them were sent to gas chambers of Treblinka extermination camp.

On December 6, 1942, in nearby villages Stary Ciepielów and Rekówka thirty-one Poles, among them women and children, were murdered for helping Jews. Also, two Jewish refugees were among the victims.
