= Radom Synagogue =

Destroyed synagogue in Radom, Poland

- Polish: Synagoga w Radomiu
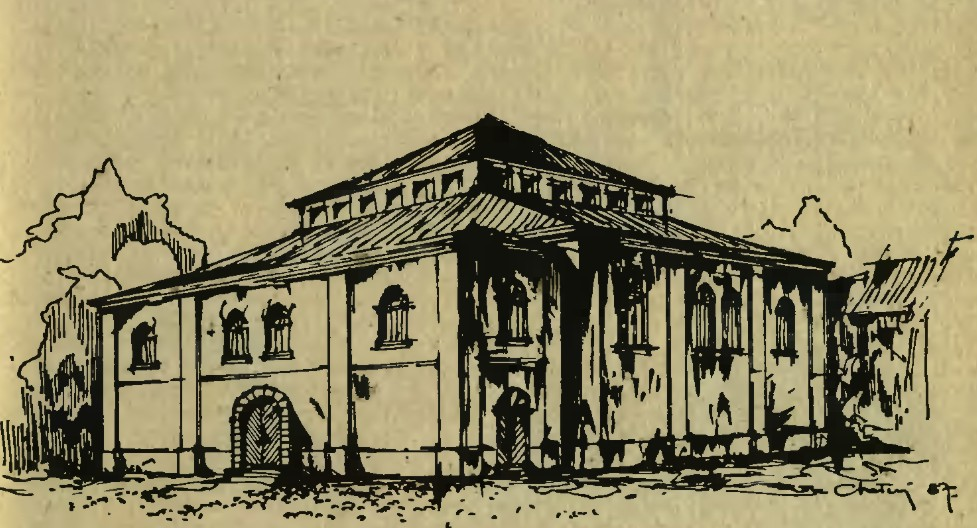
- The former synagogue, based on historical records, rendering from 1987

- Location of the destroyed synagogue in Masovian Voivodeship

Religion
- Affiliation: Orthodox Judaism (former)
- Ecclesiastical or organizational status: Synagogue (1846–1939)
- Status: Destroyed

Location
- Location: Podwalna Street, previously named Bożnicza Street, Radom, Masovian Voivodeship
- Country: Poland
- Interactive map of Radom Synagogue
- Coordinates: 51°24′04″N 21°08′38″E

Architecture
- Type: Synagogue architecture
- Completed: 1846
- Destroyed: 1939
- Materials: Brick

The Radom Synagogue (Polish: Synagoga w Radomiu) was a former Orthodox Jewish congregation and synagogue, located on Podwalna Street, previously named Bożnicza Street, in Radom, in the Masovian Voivodeship of Poland.

== History ==
Completed in 1846, the synagogue served as a house of prayer until World War II when it was destroyed by Nazis following the invasion of Poland in 1939. The synagogue was burned to the ground when the Radom Ghetto was set up. Almost all Radom Jews perished during the Holocaust in occupied Poland resulting in nearly complete abandonment of the site. After the end of war, the ruins of the synagogue were dismantled on the orders of the local pro-Soviet communist government.

In 1950, during the following period of Stalinism in Poland, at the empty lot where the synagogue once stood, the local officials erected a memorial commemorating the lost Jewish community of Radom based on a design of Jakub Zajdensznir, and inscribed as devoted to victims of Nazism.

== See also ==
- History of the Jews in Poland
- List of active synagogues in Poland
