= Pilica Castle =

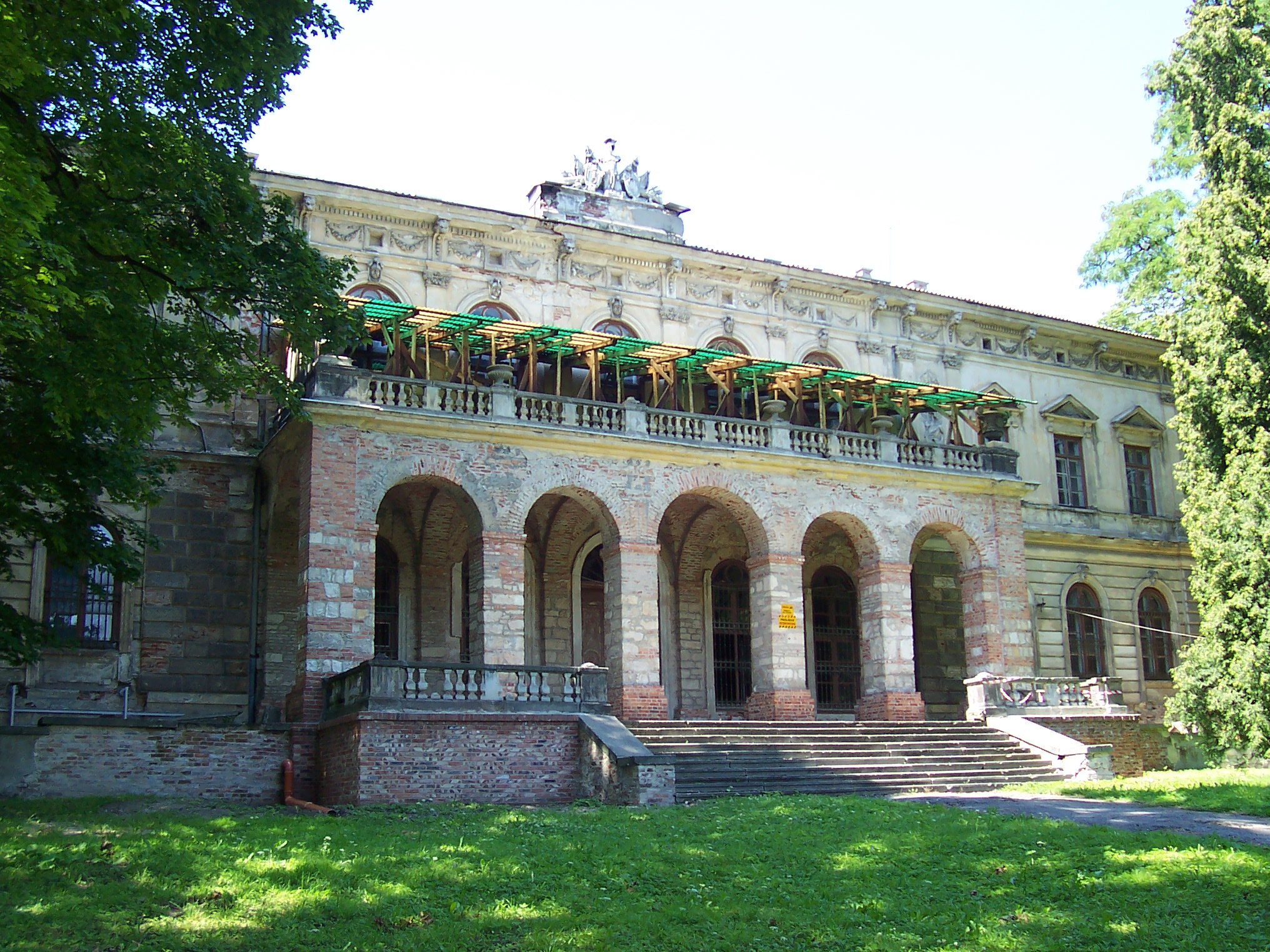
- Palace on the Pilica castle grounds

- Location of the Pilica Castle in Poland
- 50°28′02″N 19°38′57″E
- Location: Pilica, Silesian Voivodeship, in Poland

History
- Built: 17-19th century

Site notes
- Architectural style: Neo-Renaissance

Pilica Castle - Neo-Renaissance castle (or palace) located in Pilica, in Zawiercie County, Silesian Voivodeship, in Poland. The castle is located in the Kraków-Częstochowa Upland. Encircled by bastion fortifications, the castle is made up of four wings, surrounding an interior courtyard.

The castle is surrounded by a 10 ha park with diverse fauna and flora. There is a Classicist well in the park.

== See also ==
- Castles in Poland
