= Siedliska, Miechów County =

Siedliska
- Village
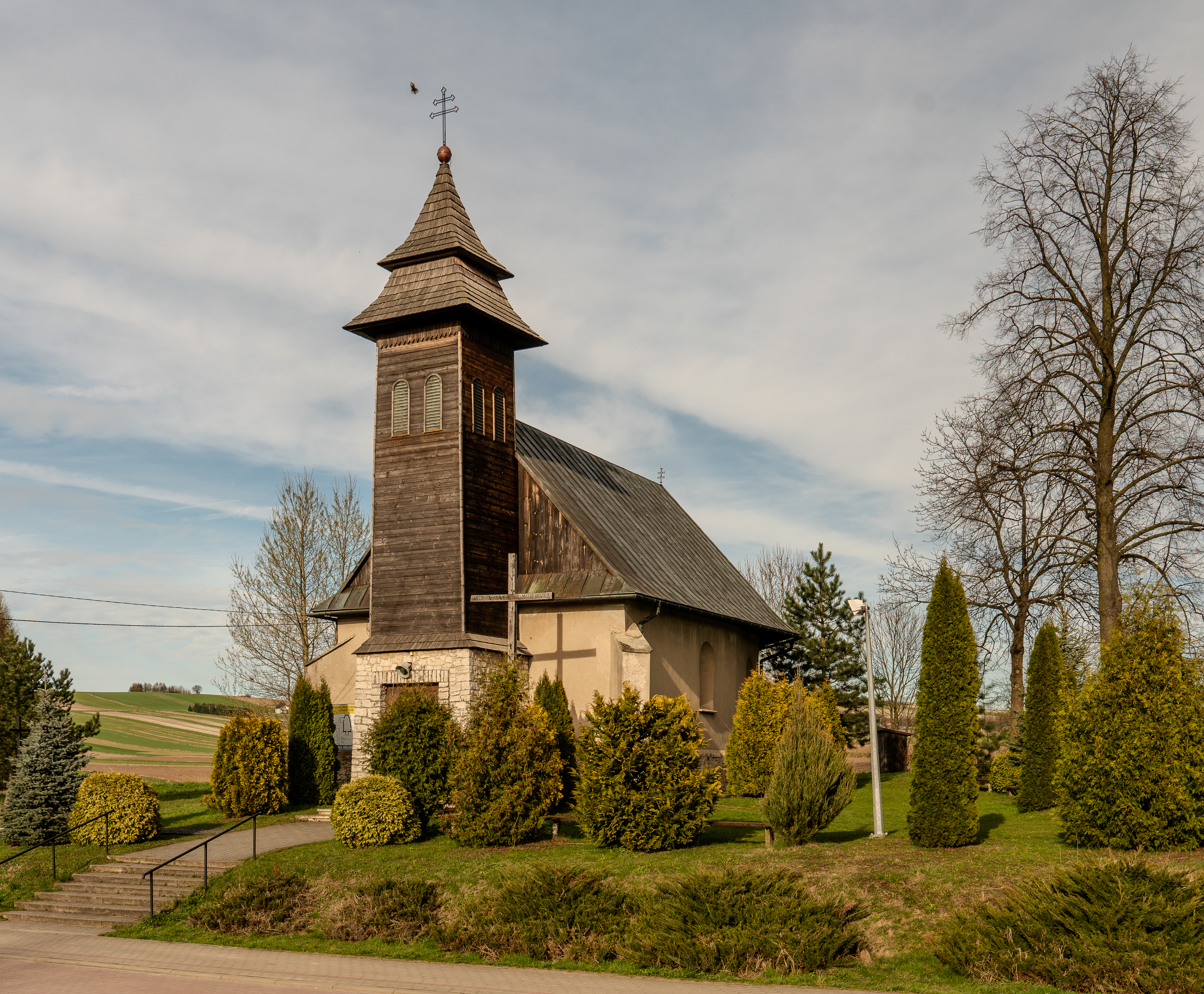
- Catholic church

- Location within Poland
- Coordinates: 50°22′42″N 20°01′24″E
- Country: Poland
- Voivodeship: Lesser Poland
- County: Miechów
- Gmina: Miechów
- Population: 130

Siedliska [ɕɛdˈlʲiska] is a village in the administrative district of Gmina Miechów, within Miechów County, Lesser Poland Voivodeship, in southern Poland.

== History ==
On March 15, 1943, during the German occupation of Poland, five-member family of Baranek were executed in Siedliska for helping Jews. Also, four Jewish refugees were murdered with them.
