= Shmuel Krakowski =

Israeli historian

Shmuel Krakowski, Samuel Krakowski or Stefan Krakowski (Hebrew: שמואל קרקובסקי; 23 March 1926 – September 2018) was an Israeli historian specializing in the Holocaust in Poland. After surviving the Holocaust, Krakowski worked for the intelligence and security services of the People's Republic of Poland. Later he became a Director of the Yad Vashem Archives in Israel.

== Biography ==
Krakowski was born in Warsaw in a Polish-Jewish family to father Baruch and mother Miriam, but grew up in Łódź. At a young age he joined the Zionist youth organization Hashomer Hatzair. During World War II, he was imprisoned with other local Jews in the Łódź Ghetto, where he was involved with underground resistance. After the Łódź Ghetto was liquidated, he survived concentration camps at Auschwitz, Buchenwald, and Theresienstadt.

Krakowski returned to Poland where he joined the structures of the new Polish communist government in 1945, taking the entry courses for the Polish Workers' Party that year. He joined the Ministry of Public Security, and in 1946, he was a government agent in the small Zionist Polish Jewish political party Ichud; in 1949, Krakowski was an employee of the Ministry's Department VII (Intelligence). From 1949 to 1951 he was attached to the Polish Delegation at the United Nations, while working for the Polish military (Polish People's Army) intelligence agency (the Second Department of Polish General Staff (1949-1951)). From 1951 to 1956 he worked at the intelligence agency that was successor to the Second Department, the II Office of the Headquarter Staff of the People's Polish Army, in the sections responsible for intelligence operations related to the Americas, Asia, and the Middle East. Afterward, he took a course in the Polish Headquarter Staff Academy, then was attached to the Aviation Inspectorate at the Polish People's Air Force. He was eventually promoted to the rank of major.

In 1966 Krakowski requested and was given a leave of active service. Later he worked in the Museum of the History of the Polish Revolutionary Movement in Warsaw and subsequently in the Jewish Historical Institute in Warsaw.

Following the 1968 Polish political crisis and a related antisemitic Polish government campaign, Krakowski moved to Israel.

=== In Israel ===
In Israel Krakowski worked at the Yad Vashem Archives from 1968 until his retirement in 1993. He received a doctorate from the Hebrew University of Jerusalem. His PhD thesis was about the armed Jewish resistance to the General Government. This research won Krakowski the 1975 Yitzhak Sadeh Prize for military research. Krakowski also taught courses at the Tel Aviv University.

During Krakowski's tenure as the director of the Yad Vashem archives, the volume of them tripled and the relations with the office of investigations of Nazi crimes at Ludwigsburg, Germany, were strengthened. He was involved in improving the contents related to reports of Nazi war criminals, including the files of the Soviet commission of investigation of Nazi crimes and the archives of the Jewish Anti-Fascist Committee that operated during the war in the Soviet Union. Krakowski initiated the connection with the Soviet archives and, when they became accessible, also initiated their photocopying and integration with Yad Vashem archives.

After his retirement as director of the archives, Krakowski continued to be an adviser to the archives for about five years. Later, he was a researcher and an adviser at the International Institute for Holocaust Research at Yad Vashem. He was also a member of The Commission for the Designation of the Righteous Among the Nations at Yad Vashem.

== Works ==
- The War of the Doomed: Jewish Armed Resistance in Poland, 1942–1944 (1984)
- Unequal Victims: Poles and Jews During World War Two (1988 with Yisrael Gutman)
- Chelmno, A Small Village in Europe: The First Nazi Mass Extermination Camp (2009)
