= Rekówka =

Village in Masovian Voivodeship, Poland

- Village
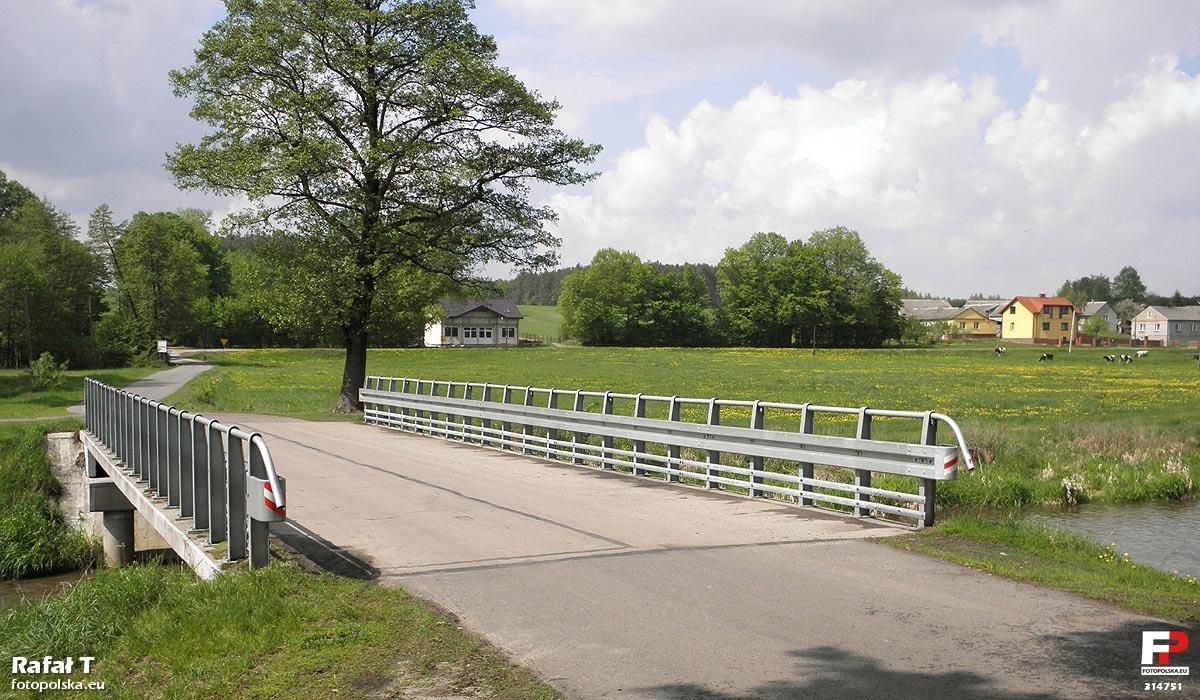
- Bridge over the Iłżanka River in Rekówka

- Location within Poland
- Coordinates: 51°14′31″N 21°36′48″E
- Country: Poland
- Voivodeship: Masovian
- County: Lipsko
- Gmina: Ciepielów
- Time zone: UTC+1 (CET)
  - Summer (DST): UTC+2 (CEST)
- Vehicle registration: WLI

Rekówka [rɛˈkufka] is a village in the administrative district of Gmina Ciepielów, within Lipsko County, Masovian Voivodeship, in east-central Poland.

== History ==
Rekówka was a private village, administratively located in the Radom County in the Sandomierz Voivodeship in the Lesser Poland Province of the Kingdom of Poland,

During the German occupation (World War II), on December 6, 1942, German Gendarmerie murdered ten Poles from Rekówka who were suspected of hiding the Jewish refuges. The victims were two men, two women and six children.
