= Stary Ciepielów =

- Village
- Location within Poland
- Coordinates: 51°15′21″N 21°35′52″E
- Country: Poland
- Voivodeship: Masovian
- County: Lipsko
- Gmina: Ciepielów

Stary Ciepielów [ˈstarɨ t͡ɕɛˈpjɛluf] is a village in the administrative district of Gmina Ciepielów, within Lipsko County, Masovian Voivodeship, in east-central Poland.

On December 6, 1942, German Gendarmerie murdered twenty-one Poles from Stary Ciepielów who were suspected of aiding the Jewish refuges. Women and children were among the victims. Also, two Jews were executed.
