= Grymalow =

Grymalow can refer to:

- Grzymałów, a village in Łódź Voivodeship, Poland
- Grzymałów, a village in Lesser Poland Voivodeship, Poland
- Grzymałów, another name for Hrymailiv, a town in Ternopil Oblast of Ukraine
