= ABUS =

Manufacturing company of Germany

Coordinates: 51°21′25.128″N 7°22′58.944″E

ABUS August Bremicker Söhne KG

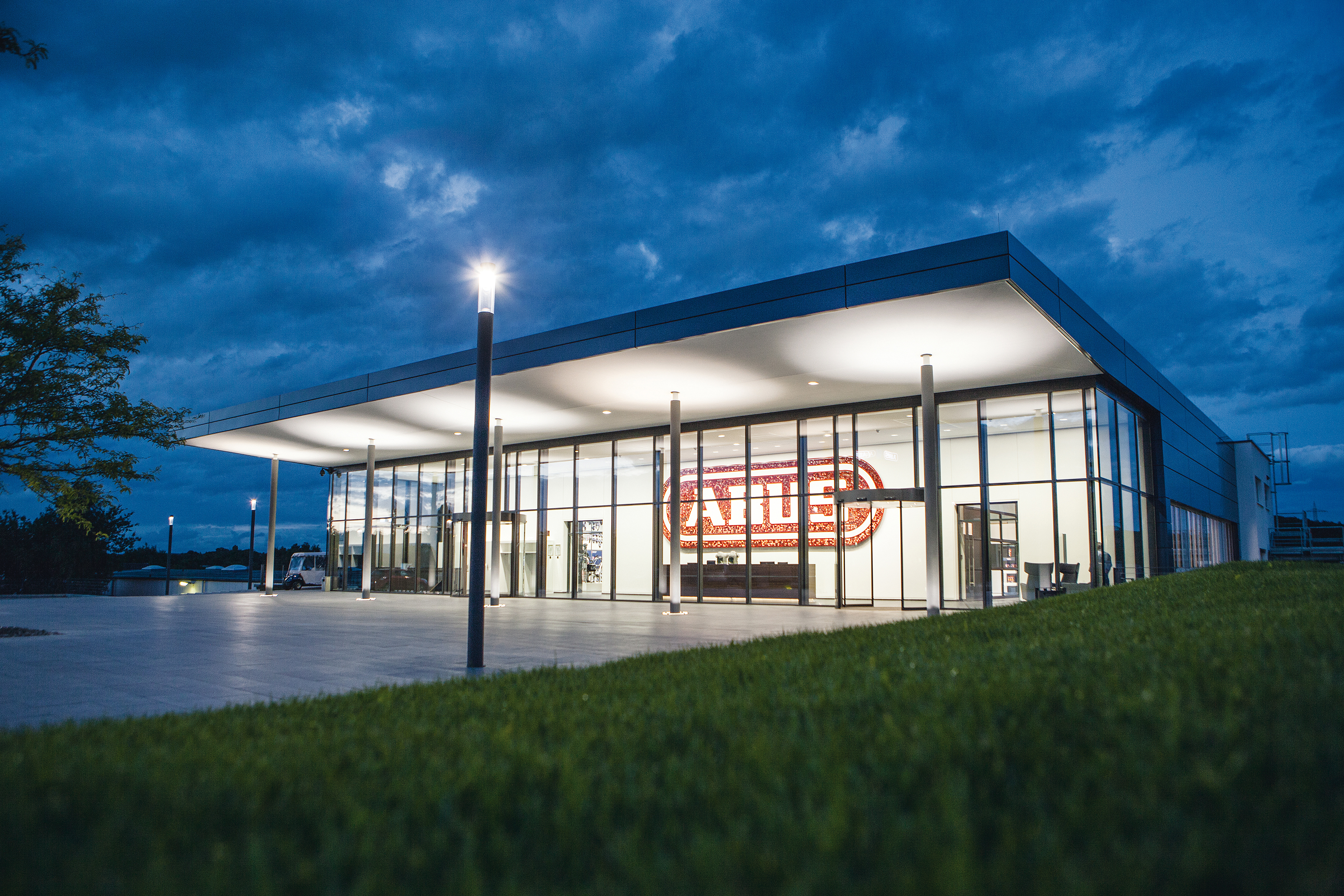
- ABUS headquarters in Wetter, Germany
- Type: Private
- Industry: Security
- Founded: 1924; 102 years ago
- Headquarters: Wetter, North Rhine-Westphalia, Germany
- Key people: Christian Bremicker (CEO)
- Revenue: €310 million (2016)
- Number of employees: Around 3,500
- Website: www.abus.com

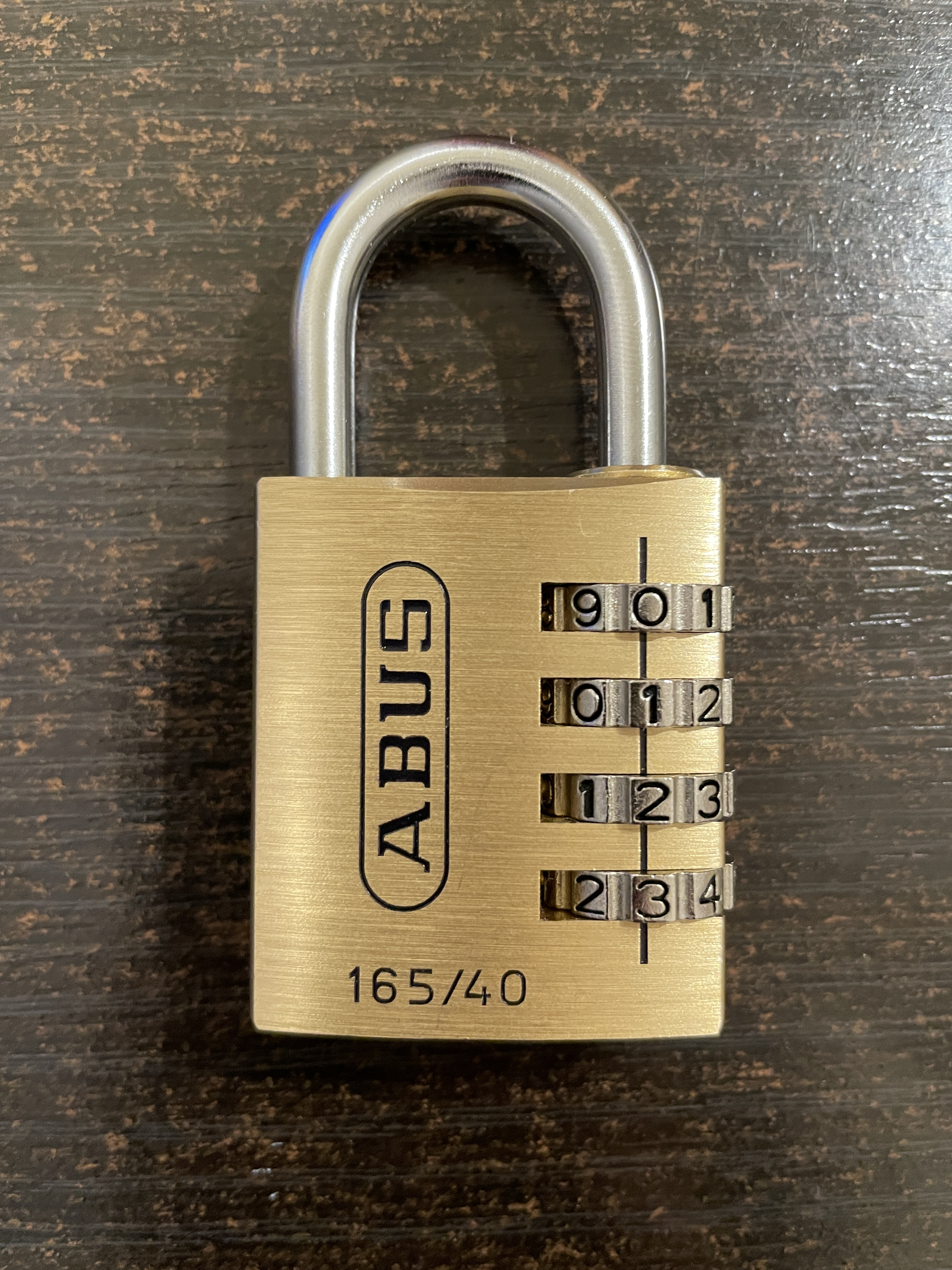
An ABUS 165/40 padlock

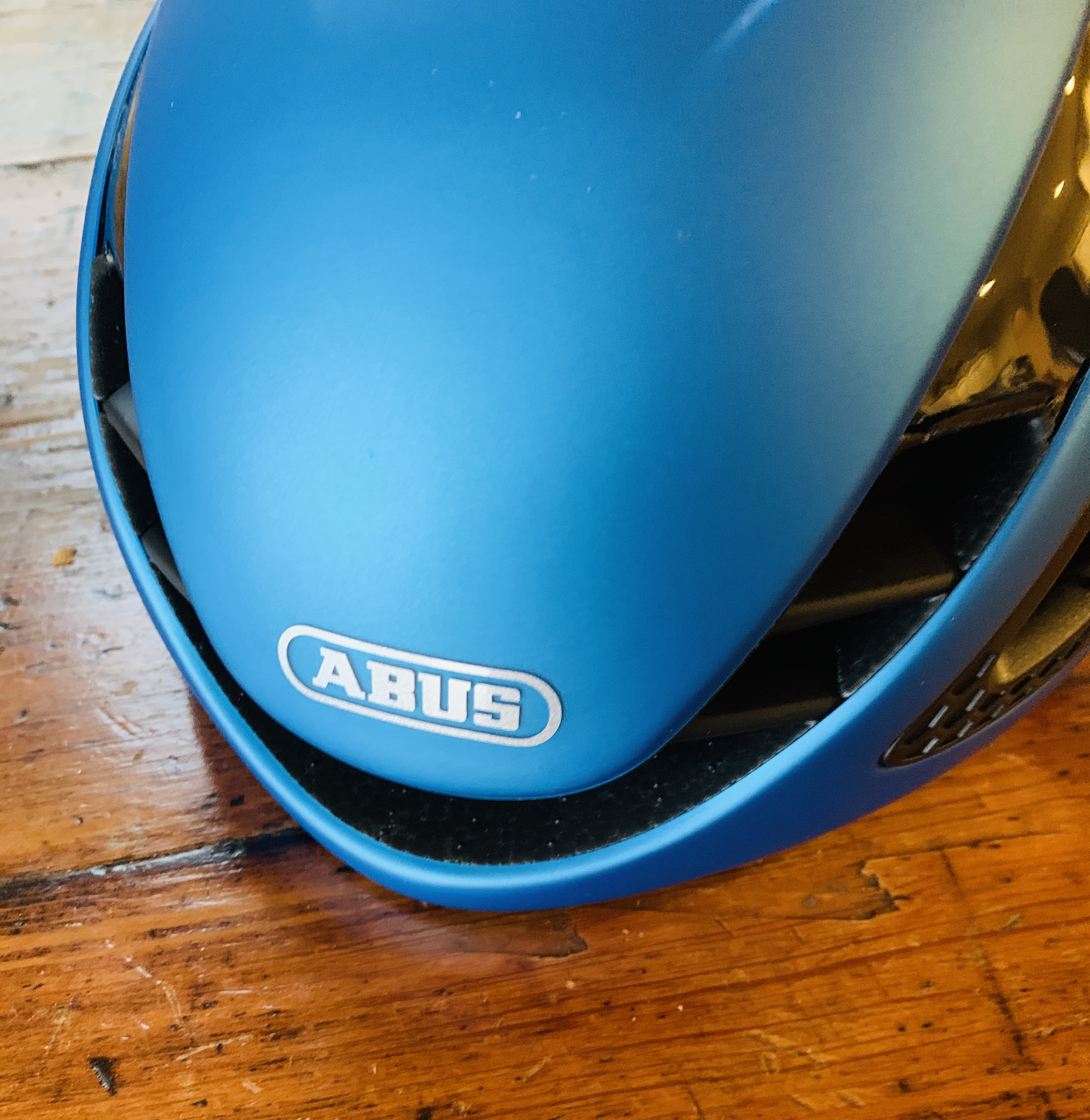
ABUS Gamechanger bicycle helmet

August Bremicker Söhne KG, commonly known as ABUS, is a German manufacturer of security solutions, primarily preventative security technology. The company had remained headquartered in Wetter, North Rhine-Westphalia since its founding. Its name is an acronym of its original name, August Bremicker und Söhne ("August Bremicker and Sons").

The family-owned company offers a range of products designed to enhance home, mobile and property security. Over the years, its product range has expanded to include locks, smoke detectors, video surveillance systems, alarm systems, bicycle and boat security products, locking systems, access control systems and smart home solutions for both private and commercial customers.

Its operations span Europe, Asia, and the United States of America, and the family-owned company employs approximately 4000 individuals across its various facilities.

== History ==
=== Company foundation: early years to 1946 ===
The company traces its origins back to 1924, when the then 63-year-old August Bremicker (186-1938) along with several of his sons, established the business. Production operations were initially located in a basement forge in Volmarstein. Initially, ABUS was limited to the manufacture of padlocks. One of the first products to emerge from the forge was the "Iron Rock" padlock. Five years after its foundation, the family business acquired a new 6,000-square-metre (65,000 sq ft) building in Volmarstein, to expand its production capacity. By the end of the 1920s, ABUS had grown its workforce to over 30 employees.

In 1931, ABUS introduced its inaugural bicycle lock to the market, labelled No. 1000. ABUS managed its growth trajectory by procuring additional facilities, culminating in the acquisition of an unoccupied factory. Further expansion took place in 1936 with the construction of a new building.

At the end of the 1930s, ABUS employed around 300 people, with 80% of its revenue stemming from exports. During the National Socialist regime, like many enterprises of the era, the company resorted to employing forced labourers from a civilian labour camp in Hagen. Among these labourers was Pierre Roustan, whose name was associated with the company in a corresponding register with the business listed as 'Bremicker Soehne, August, Volmarstein'.

In the aftermath of the Second World War, ABUS was required to suspend production operations entirely. Despite this, it is reported that cordial relations between the workers at the time and representatives of the company continued beyond the end of the war.

=== Post war revival and further developments (1947–1999) ===
In 1947, ABUS received official authorisation to resume operations. ABUS recommenced its activities with a workforce of 79 employees. In 1949, ABUS commemorated its 25th anniversary with the introduction of its innovative lock, the discus lock. The lock design continues to be manufactured at the Hege facility today. Up until the 1950s, ABUS almost exclusively produced padlocks and bicycle locks fashioned from sheet metal and steel. However, as demands for expansion outgrew the capacity of its original premises, in 1957 ABUS erected a second plant in Rehe, in the Westerwald. From 1957, ABUS evolved its Rehe facility into a multifaceted hub, encompassing production facilities, an in-house research and development centre, and from the late 1990s, a dedicated training centre. With the expansion, the Rehe site enabled ABUS to diversify its product range to manufacture security solutions spanning home security, property protection, and mobile security.

In 1958, ABUS ventured into the production of brass padlocks, becoming the first German company to introduce this form of lock to the market. In 1961, in partnership with an Italian manufacturing business, the company added profile cylinders to its portfolio.

With the increase of its market exports, ABUS established ABUS Hong Kong Ltd in 1969, which marked the onset of its presence in the IndoAsian area. The company now operates multiple facilities dedicated to manufacturing brass padlocks and other security solutions in the Far East.

During the early 1970s, the company expanded its range of mechanical security products for houses and flats. Since then, the range has also included door locks and additional window locks. In 1971, ABUS produced the first high shackle lock (also known as a U-shaped lock) and thus developed the first shackle lock for two-wheelers. In 1979, the company unveiled the first window lock to the market, followed by the introduction of the security door in 1984. Ten years later, the company set up the ABUS demo security house, which showcased potential security devices spanning from the cellar to the roof, offering consumers firsthand insights into the efficacy of security solutions for residential properties.

In 1993, ABUS spun off its Mobile Security division, streamlining its operations to focus on its core competencies. The following year, in 1994, the company began selling bicycle helmets, entering the personal safety market.

Since 1997, the company has been an official training provider for law enforcement agencies including the police. ABUS offers comprehensive training programs tailored to police officers, trainers and security consultants on the topics of burglary protection and mechanical security.

=== Modern history (from 2000) ===
Throughout the 2000s, ABUS acquired several companies or parts of companies. These acquisitions encompassed new sectors including integrated alarm systems, video surveillance systems, extended functions for locking systems, locking systems, and switching devices - expanding the ABUS portfolio.

The following acquisitions were made:

- SCA Security-Centre (alarm systems and video surveillance systems), founded in June 1999 and acquired by ABUS in June 2001.
- Schließanlagen GmbH Pfaffenhain (locking systems), acquired in January 2003.
- In October 2003, the product area of escutcheon plate products was taken over by the door hinge manufacturer Dr Hahn, in Mönchengladbach.
- SECCOR high security GmbH (electronic locking systems and switching devices) was bought in September 2010.
- In January 2020, ABUS took over the cylinder business of Metafa Holland B.V.
- Maxi Studio S.R.L., an Italian helmet manufacturer with which the company had been working since 2016, was fully acquired in 2021.

In tandem with these acquisitions, ABUS implemented organisational changes including renaming the subsidiaries to reflect a closer alignment with the parent company. The subsidiaries were renamed ABUS Security Center GmbH & Co. KG (based in Wetter (Ruhr) with a branch office in Affing near Augsburg), ABUS Pfaffenahin GmbH (based in Pfaffenhain) and ABUS Seccor GmbH (based in Ottobrunn). Sector high security GmbH was merged into ABUS Sector GmbH on 1 January 2017.

In 2015, the company opened ABUS Security World at its headquarters in Wetter. This facility houses a comprehensive brand experience centre, featuring an expansive exhibition area spanning over 1,000 square metres (11,000 sq ft) along with a museum.

At the end of 2020, the company began construction of a new office and exhibition centre, ABUS Office World, at the Wetter (Ruhr) site, which was completed in 2022.

In 2022, an independent IT security researcher alerted the German Federal Office for Information Security (de: Bundesamt für Sicherheit in der Informationstechnik) (BSI) to a vulnerability discovered in the HomeTec Pro CFA3000 wireless door lock. This report was part of a Coordinated Vulnerability Disclosure (VCD ) process. Following the submission, the BSI assessed the exploitation as "not unlikely", and categorised the vulnerability at the second-highest risk level. Consequently, the BSI recommended that customers replace the affected product. Upon confirmation of the vulnerability by the company to the BSI, ABUS clarified that the affected product is a discontinued model. As such, a software update to rectify the vulnerability is not technically feasible. However, it was noted that the successor to the affected product (HomeTec Pro Bluetooth CFA 3100) has been on the market since March 2021 and is not affected by the issue.

In the same year, ABUS was featured in the publication "Aus bester Familie" released by Zeitverlag, and additionally became a network partner of VFL Bochum.

In addition to several production facilities in Germany, the ABUS Group operates around 20 foreign branches in Europe, the United States and China. It is the world market leader in bike locks and padlocks. In November 2012, it received the "Brand of the Century" Award for security technology.

In 2024, ABUS celebrated its 100th anniversary.

== Company ==
ABUS is headquartered in Wetter, North Rhine-Westphalia, and has manufacturing facilities across Germany and in China. It has around 3,500 employees worldwide. The company is reported to be "shaped by Christian principles".

The ABUS Group in Germany currently comprises ABUS KG, ABUS Security Centre GmbH & Co. KG and ABUS Pfaffenhain GmbH. ABUS Pfaffenhain GmbH specialises in the planning and manufacture of locking systems, while ABUS Security Center in Affing develops, markets, and partly manufactures alarm systems, surveillance cameras and electronic locking systems.

=== Locations ===
In addition to several development and production sites in Germany, the company has foreign branches in Europe, the US and China.

- Germany (Wetter, Rehe, Pfaffenhain, Affing)
- Belgium (Hasselt)
- China (Shenzhen, Kalping)
- Denmark (Horsens)
- France (Villeneuve le Roi)
- Great Britain (Bristol)
- Hong Kong
- Italy (Imola, Vanzo Nuovo)
- Netherlands (Terschuur, Son)
- Austria (Wiener Neudorf)
- Poland (Święcice)
- Romania (Oradea)
- Switzerland (Baar)
- Spain (Erandio)
- Czech Republic (Vestec)
- Hungary (Budapest)
- US (Phoenix, Chicago)

== Products ==
The company's products are divided into three main areas: home security, mobile security and property security, each of which is developed and manufactured with a different focus for private residential and commercial users.

In addition to locks, such as the classic padlock or locks for doors, windows, bicycles and motorbikes, ABUS also produces smoke alarms, video surveillance systems, products for two-wheeler and boat security, alarm systems, locking systems and access control systems, and in 2018, Abus expanded its range of smart home solutions.

In August 2022, a security vulnerability was discovered in a wireless door lock from the manufacturer.

== Family ownership ==
ABUS August Bremicker Söhne KG and its subsidiaries remain wholly owned by members of the Bremicker family to this day. Since the late 1990s, the company has been overseen by family members belonging to the fourth generation, with the introduction, as of January 2021, of fifth-generation family members into the management structure.

In the ranking of the 500 richest Germans, published by Manager Magazin's annual list of the 500 wealthiest Germans in 2013, the family ranked 422nd position. At that time, the magazine estimated the collective assets of the family to be approximately €300 million. However, precise and current data regarding the company's turnover and the Bremicker family assets are not readily available.

Several members of the Bremicker family, belonging to the Kelly-Lowe-Continental wing of the Plymouth Brethren (Brüderbewegung) are associated with the Evangelical Brethren movement, a free church movement originating in the 19th century. The personal religious convictions of individual family members are, to some extent, reflected in the company's ethos and self-portrayal, with the company's mission statement imbued with Christian values.

However, the involvement of female family members in the company has been a subject of scrutiny. Equal participation of women in the company has been met with reservation and critique. In 1983, descendants of a former ABUS shareholder entered into a family contract that included a provision waiving inheritance rights for daughters of shareholders. Nevertheless, records indicate that there were instances where women held shares in ABUS.

== Cooperation and sponsorships ==
Since 2017, ABUS has served as a technical supplier to the Spanish UCI WorldTour team, Movistar Team. The collaboration commenced with the unveiling of the new Game Changer racing helmet, which the company developed jointly with the team's athletes. In 2022, ABUS extended its collaboration with the team for a further three years. Under the extended agreement, ABUS will continue to provide support to not only the Movistar Team, but also the Movistar Women's Team and the Movistar eTeam as an official helmet and safety partner until 2025.

In 2017, ABUS partnered with the NBA basketball team Phoenix Suns. Since 2018, it has supported the Savemybrain Foundation, an organisation dedicated to the prevention of head injuries. Additionally, ABUS is involved with the Weißer Ring, a nationwide aid organisation in Germany that supports victims of crime, and the German Society for Gerontotechnology, which focuses on improving the quality of life for the elderly through technology.

In March 2023, ABUS announced a collaboration with the delivery service Flink, providing them with bicycle helmets featuring the company’s design. Since May 2023, ABUS has been supporting the Swiss Tudor Pro Cycling Team around Fabian Cancellara, and, since April 2024, the Belgian cycling teams Alpecin-Deceuninck, Mathieu van der Poel and Fenix-Deceuninck.

More recently, in September 2022, ABUS became a network partner of VFL Bochum, a professional football club in Germany. In July 2024, ABUS announced a new partnership with Dawid Godziek, a Polish BMX rider and mountain biker, and two-time X Games winner.

== Awards ==
ABUS has received numerous recognitions as an employer, brand, and for its specific products in recent decades. Some notable awards within its recent history include repeated recognition as a "Brand of the Century", designation as one of the best employers, and ranking among Germany's most innovative companies.

Additional awards include:

within the security technology category. In May 2015, ABUS was further recognised with the Red Dot Award - Product Design for three of its products for cyclists. ABUS also received the following:

- Plus X Award in the "Most Innovative Brand" category in 2013, and for its alarm systems in March 2015
- inclusion in the publication "Aus bester Familie" by Zeitverlag (2017)
- 1st place among 2,439 providers in a nationwide product enthusiasm rating by Die Welt and ServiceValue GmbH, titled 'Product Campions' (2020)
- Ranked 82nd place overall in the "Germany's 500 Best Employers" study conducted by Statista and Stern magazine. They additionally listed 10th in the "Durable Consumer Goods" category and 3rd among the most attractive employers in the Ruhr region in 2020.
- Recognition by Stiftung Warentest as the best of its kind for the ABUS Granit Plus 640 bicycle U-lock (2021)
- Ranked 2nd in the category "Durable Consumer Goods" for Top Employer Diversity by Stern in cooperation with Statista (2021)
- Life & Living Award in the "Building Safety" category, awarded by n-tv (2021, 2022)
- Eurobike Award for various bicycle products and helmets
- Red Dot Design Award - Product Design
