= Jerzy Bielecki (Auschwitz survivor) =

Polish Catholic social worker who escaped from Auschwitz

- Bielecki in 1944 after he escaped from Auschwitz and joined the Home Army
- Born: 28 March 1921; Słaboszów, Poland
- Died: 20 October 2011 (aged 90); Nowy Targ
- Occupation: Social worker

Notes
- Auschwitz survivor, Bielecki escaped to freedom with Cyla Cybulska in 1944. He became Head of postwar Christian Association of the Auschwitz Families.

Jerzy Bielecki (28 March 1921 – 20 October 2011) was a Polish Catholic social worker, best known as one of the few inmates of the Auschwitz concentration camp who managed to escape successfully. With the help of other resistance members in the camp, he escaped in 1944 together with his Jewish girlfriend, who was an inmate of Auschwitz II. In 1985 Bielecki received the Righteous Among the Nations award. He also co-founded and headed the postwar Christian Association of the Auschwitz Families.

== Biography ==
Bielecki was born in 1921 in Słaboszów, Poland. A pupil at a gymnasium in Kraków, at the outbreak of World War II, he decided to join the Polish Army in the West. While crossing the border with Hungary on 7 May 1940, en route to trying to join up with the Polish Army stationed in France, he was caught and arrested by the Gestapo on the false suspicion that he was a resistance fighter. A month later, on 14 June 1940, he was sent to the newly created Auschwitz concentration camp with the first transport of 728 Polish political prisoners. (His concentration camp number is 243). His decent knowledge of the German language allowed him to work, among other jobs at various times, at a mill (grain) warehouse in Babice (future subcamp of Auschwitz, German: Wirtschaftshof Babitz) as a clerk, where he had occasional access to additional food and came in contact with the Polish anti-Nazi resistance, the Home Army.

=== Escape from Auschwitz ===
Assigned to an Arbeitskommando at Auschwitz, Bielecki met Cyla Cybulska at a grain warehouse, serving with the women repairing burlap sacks. She was a Jewish inmate of Auschwitz-Birkenau (Auschwitz II) since 19 January 1943, (concentration camp number 29558) deported from the ghetto in Zambrów. Despite the fact that men and women were not allowed to talk to each other, the two managed to exchange a few words every day, and they fell in love. Cyla's family had already been murdered.

With time, he secretly collected the necessary supplies for an escape. On 21 July 1944 they managed to cross the camp's gate together using a faked green pass, prepared by Bielecki. He was dressed in an SS uniform, assembled from parts of German uniforms bearing the Rottenführer insignia, stolen by Tadeusz Srogi (concentration camp number 178, a friend he made during transport to the camp), who had also supplied the form for the pass. At various points along the journey, Cyla wanted to give up, but Bielecki coaxed and supported her through it, and promised that they both would survive the ordeal. Jerzy and Cyla walked through the fields for ten days.

Cybulska was initially hidden at Bielecki's uncle's house at Przemęczany, where Bielecki's mother also lived, and later by his friends, the Czernik family, in a nearby Gruszów village. They treated her like their own daughter. Bielecki himself joined the Home Army. Towards the end of the war he and Cyla separated; Bielecki went into hiding in Kraków, hoping to improve their chances against being recaptured, and they planned to reunite after the war.

As Monika Ścisłowska reported, for the Associated Press:

After the Soviet army rolled through Krakow in January 1945, Bielecki left the city where he had been hiding from Nazi pursuit and walked 25 miles along snow-covered roads to meet Cybulska at the farmhouse. But he arrived four days too late. Cybulska, not aware that the area where she had been hiding had been liberated three weeks before Kraków, gave up waiting for him, concluding that her 'Juracek' either was dead or had abandoned their plans. She got on a train to Warsaw, planning to find an uncle in the U.S. On the train she met a Jewish man, David Zacharowitz, and the two began a relationship and eventually married. They headed to Sweden, then to New York to Cybulska's uncle, who helped them start a jewelry business. Zacharowitz died in 1975. In Poland, Bielecki eventually started a family of his own and worked as director of a school for car mechanics. He had no news of Cybulska and had no way of finding her. — Monika Ścisłowska, AP

Cyla was informed that he had been killed during Operation Tempest, while he was told she had left the country and died in Sweden.

== Post-war ==
It was not until May 1983, in New York, that Cybulska accidentally learned that Bielecki was alive and well when a Polish woman cleaning her family's apartment mentioned a documentary in which she had seen them recount his story. Cyla acquired his phone number, and the couple met the following month in Poland, on 8 June 1983, for the first time since the war ended.

As Monika Ścisłowska reported for the Associated Press:

She visited him in Poland many times, and they jointly visited the Auschwitz memorial, the farmer family that hid her, and other places, staying together in hotels. 'The love started to come back,' Bielecki said. 'Cyla was telling me, 'Leave your wife, come with me to America,' he recalled. 'She cried a lot when I told her: Look, I have such fine children. ... How could I do that?' She returned to New York and wrote to him: 'Jurek I will not come again,' he recalled. They never met again, and she did not reply to his letters. She died a few years later in New York in 2002. — Monika Ścisłowska, AP Note: According to tombstone photo featured at Findagrave.com, Cyla Zacharowicz (spelled Zacharowitz by Ścisłowska) died in 2005, not in 2002.

After the war, Bielecki co-founded and became the honorary chairman of the Christian Association of the Auschwitz Families. He was also inscribed on the list of the Righteous Among the Nations (in 1985), and became an honorary citizen of Israel. He died in Nowy Targ on 20 October 2011. His escape from the camp with Cybulska was described in a number of documentaries and books, including Bielecki's own autobiography, Kto ratuje jedno życie... (He who saves one life...) (1990).

== See also ==
- The Holocaust in Poland
- Remembrance (2011 film)
