= Grębocin =

Grębocin may refer to the following places:

- Grębocin, Kuyavian-Pomeranian Voivodeship (north-central Poland)
- Grębocin, Lesser Poland Voivodeship (south Poland)
- Grębocin, West Pomeranian Voivodeship (north-west Poland)
