= Śladów =

Śladów can refer to:

- Śladów, Lesser Poland Voivodeship
- Śladów, Masovian Voivodeship
