= Ilkowice, Miechów County =

Ilkowice
- Village
- Location within Poland
- Coordinates: 50°23′21″N 20°13′50″E
- Country: Poland
- Voivodeship: Lesser Poland
- County: Miechów
- Gmina: Słaboszów
- Population: 520

Ilkowice [ilkɔˈvit͡sɛ] is a village in the administrative district of Gmina Słaboszów, within Miechów County, Lesser Poland Voivodeship, in southern Poland.
