= Kropidło, Lesser Poland Voivodeship =

Kropidło
- Village
- Location within Poland
- Coordinates: 50°21′49″N 20°13′58″E
- Country: Poland
- Voivodeship: Lesser Poland
- County: Miechów
- Gmina: Słaboszów
- Population: 330

Kropidło [krɔˈpidwɔ] is a village in the administrative district of Gmina Słaboszów, within Miechów County, Lesser Poland Voivodeship, in southern Poland.
