= Szpitary =

- Village
- Location within Poland
- Coordinates: 50°9′N 20°22′E
- Country: Poland
- Voivodeship: Lesser Poland
- County: Proszowice
- Gmina: Nowe Brzesko

Szpitary [ʂpiˈtarɨ] is a village in the administrative district of Gmina Nowe Brzesko, within Proszowice County, Lesser Poland Voivodeship, in southern Poland.
