= Gmina Nowe Brzesko =

Gmina Nowe Brzesko Nowe Brzesko Commune
- Gmina
- Flag Coat of arms
- Interactive map of Gmina Nowe Brzesko
- Coordinates (Nowe Brzesko): 50°8′14″N 20°23′5″E
- Country: Poland
- Voivodeship: Lesser Poland
- County: Proszowice
- Seat: Nowe Brzesko

Area
  - Total: 54.53 km^{2} (21.05 sq mi)

Population (2006)
  - Total: 5,769
  - Density: 105.8/km^{2} (274.0/sq mi)
- Website: http://www.nowe-brzesko.iap.pl/

Gmina Nowe Brzesko is an urban-rural gmina (administrative district) in Proszowice County, Lesser Poland Voivodeship, in southern Poland. Its seat is the town of Nowe Brzesko, which lies approximately 10 kilometres (6 mi) south-east of Proszowice and 33 km (21 mi) east of the regional capital Kraków.

The gmina covers an area of 54.53 square kilometres (21.1 sq mi), and as of 2006 its total population is 5,769. It was formerly classed as a rural gmina, becoming urban-rural when Nowe Brzesko became a town on 1 January 2011.

== Villages ==
Apart from the town of Nowe Brzesko, Gmina Nowe Brzesko contains the villages and settlements of Grębocin, Gruszów, Hebdów, Kuchary, Majkowice, Mniszów, Mniszów-Kolonia, Pławowice, Przybysławice, Rudno Dolne, Sierosławice, Śmiłowice and Szpitary.

== Neighbouring gminas ==
Gmina Nowe Brzesko is bordered by the gminas of Drwinia, Igołomia-Wawrzeńczyce, Koszyce and Proszowice.
