= Tube cleaning =

Tube cleaning describes the activity of, or device for, the cleaning and maintenance of fouled tubes.

The need for cleaning arises because the medium that is transported through the tubes may cause deposits and finally even obstructions. In system engineering and in industry, particular demands are placed upon surface roughness or heat transfer. In the food and pharmaceutical industries as well as in medical technology, the requirements are germproofness, and that the tubes are free from foreign matter, for example after the installation of the tube or after a change of product. Another trouble source may be corrosion due to deposits which may also cause tube failure.

== Cleaning methods ==
Depending on application, conveying medium and tube material, the following methods of tube cleaning are available:

=== Lost tubes ===
In the medical field, "lost" tubes are tubes which have to be replaced after single use. This is not genuine tube cleaning in the proper sense and is very often applied in the medical sector, for instance with cannulas of syringes, infusion needles or medical appliances, such as kidney machines at dialysis. The reasons for the single use are primarily the elimination of infection risks but also the fact that cleaning would be very expensive and, particularly with cheap mass products, out of all proportion in terms of cost. Single use is therefore common practice with tubes of up to 20 mm diameter. For the same reasons as in the medical sector, single use may also be applicable in the food and pharmaceutical process technology, however in these sectors the tube diameters may exceed 20 mm.

In other fields (e.g., in heat exchangers), tubing may also sometimes need to be replaced (or removed, plugged, etc.), but this typically occurs only after a prolonged use, when the tube develops serious flaws (e.g., due to corrosion).

=== Chemical process ===
Chemical tube cleaning is understood to be the use of cleaning liquids or chemicals for removing layers and deposits. A typical example is the deliming of a coffee maker where scale is removed by means of acetic acid or citric acid. Depending on the field of application and tube material, special cleaning liquids may be used which also require a multi-stage treatment:

- chemical activation
- cleaning
- rinsing

This method of cleaning calls for a shutdown of the relevant system which causes undesired standstill periods. To safeguard a continuous production operation it may be necessary to install several systems. Another disadvantage: in the field of large-scale technology (reactor, heat exchanger, condenser, etc.), huge quantities of cleaning liquids would be required which would cause major disposal problems. A further problem occurs in the food industry through the possible toxicity of the cleaning liquid. Only the strict observance of rinsing instructions and an exact control of the admissible residue tolerances can remedy things here. This in turn requires expensive detection methods. Generally the process of chemical tube cleaning is applicable for any diameter, however practical limits of use ensue from the volume of a pipeline.

=== Mechanical process ===
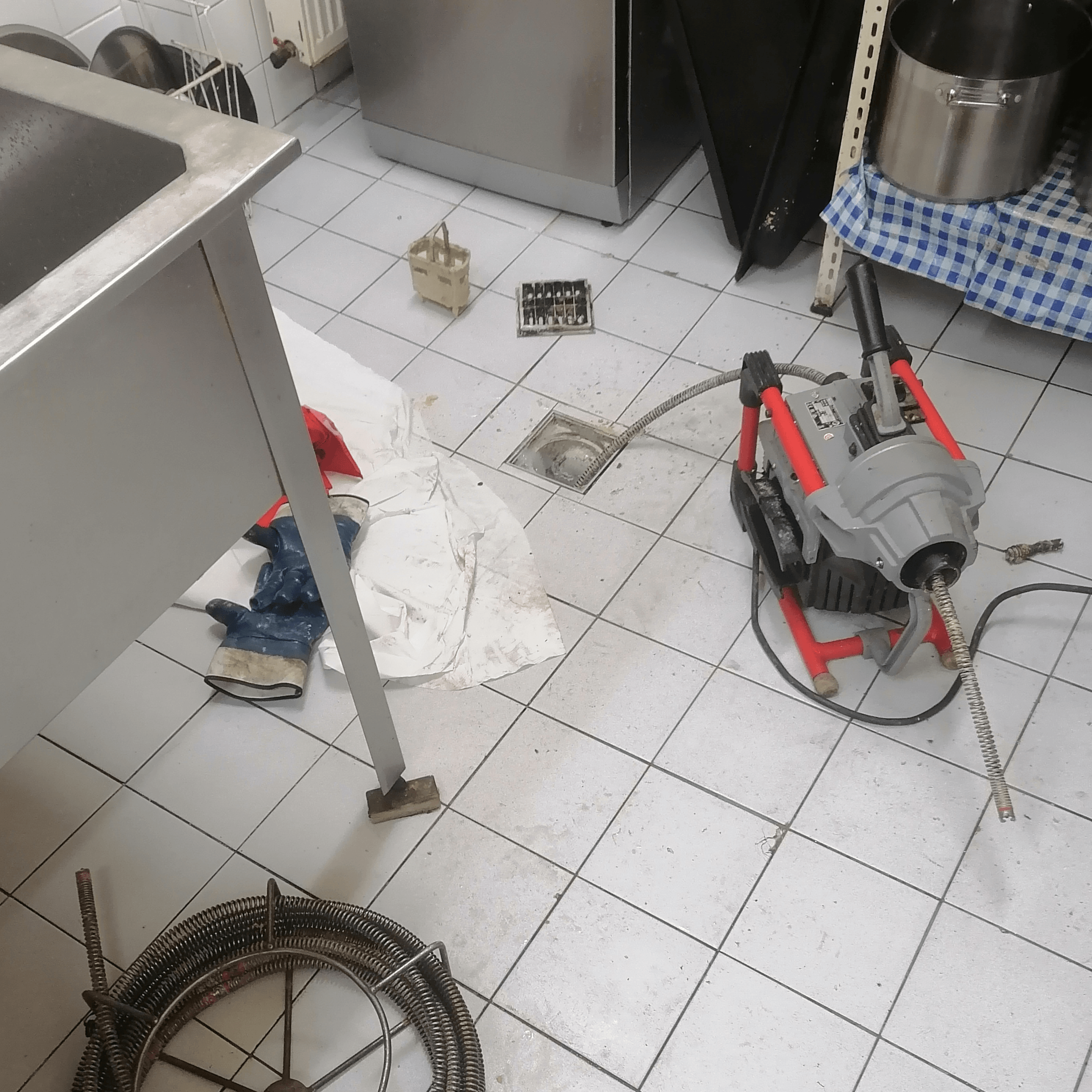
Electro-mechanical tube cleaning spring

A mechanical tube cleaning system is a cleaning body that is moved through the tube in order to remove deposits from the tube wall. In the most simple case it is a matter of a brush that is moved in the tube by means of a rod or a flexible spring (device). In large-scale technology and industrial sector, however, several processes have developed which necessitate a more detailed definition.

==== Off-line process ====
An off-line process is characterized by the fact that the system to be cleaned has to be taken out of operation in order to inject the cleaning body(ies) and to execute the cleaning procedure. An additional distinction must be made between active and passive cleaning bodies.

Passive cleaning bodies may be a matter of brushes or special constructions like scrapers or so-called "pigs", for instance, which are conveyed through the tubes by means of pressurized air, water, or other media. In most cases, cleaning is implemented through the oversize of the cleaning bodies compared to the tube inner diameter. The types range from brushes with bristles of plastic or steel to scrapers (with smaller tube diameters) and more expensive designs with spraying nozzles for pipelines. This method is applied for tube and pipe diameters from around 5 mm to several metres. Also belonging to this field is the cleaning of obstructed soil pipes of domestic sewage systems that is done by means of a rotating, flexible shaft.

The active cleaning bodies are more or less remote controlled robots that move through the tubes and fulfill their cleaning task, pulling along with them not only cables for power supply and communication but also hoses for the cleaning liquid. Also measuring devices or cameras are carried along to monitor the function. To date, such devices have still required minimum diameters of around 300 mm, however a further diminution is being worked on. The reasonable maximum diameter of this kind of devices is 2 m because above this diameter an inspection of the pipe would certainly be less expensive. For such large diameters a robot application is imaginable only if health-hazardous chemicals are in use.

==== On-line process ====
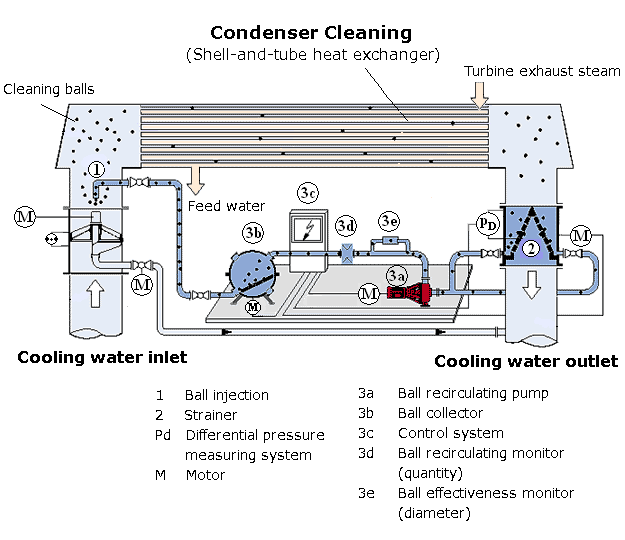
Schematic representation of the cleaning process and of the filtration technology

In the on-line process, the cleaning body moves through the tubes with the conveying medium and cleans them by means of its oversize compared to the tube diameter. In the range of diameters of up to 50 mm these cleaning bodies consist of sponge rubber, in larger diameters up to the size of oil pipelines it is a matter of scrapers or so-called pigs. Sponge rubber balls are applied mainly for cooling water, like sea, river, or cooling tower water. For the chemical or pharmaceutical industry, specially adapted cleaning bodies are imaginable but the conveying media flows are so weak that off-line processes are employed in most cases. Given the fact that the cleaning bodies are not allowed to remain in the conveying medium they have to be collected after passing through the tubes. In the case of sponge rubber balls this is done through special strainer sections; for scrapers or pigs an outward transfer station is provided. According to the Taprogge process, the sponge rubber balls are re-injected upstream of the system to be cleaned by a corresponding ball recirculating unit whereas the scraper or pig is mostly taken out by hand and re-injected into another collector. Sponge rubber balls therefore safeguard a continuous cleaning while the scraper or pig system is discontinuous.

=== Thermal process ===
In thermal tube cleaning the layer or deposit is dried through a heating whereby it flakes off due to its embrittlement and is then discharged, either by the conveying medium or a rinsing liquid. Depending on the required temperature, the heating can be either a parallel tube heating or an induction heating. This process is an off-line process. Occasionally it is also used for the sterilization of tubes in the pharmaceutical or food industry. A diameter range cannot be indicated here because this method can be applied for certain processes only; a technical limitation of the heating is given only by the materials and the required amount of heat.

=== Special types ===
Special types of tube cleaning are all such types which are partly in experimental stage only and do not come under the process types mentioned before, such as, for example:

- induction of water hammers, so that the layer or deposit comes off through short-term material elongation
- use of vibration generators, partly at the tubes through vibration exciters, partly by means of piezoelectric crystals in the conveying medium, in order to transform the conveying medium into a cleaning medium through reduction of the surface tension
- magnetic fields to avoid tube calcification
- nanotechnical treatment of tube surfaces to avoid layers and deposits

== See also ==
- Fouling
- Fouling Mitigation
- Biofouling
