= Śmiłowice, Lesser Poland Voivodeship =

Śmiłowice
- Village
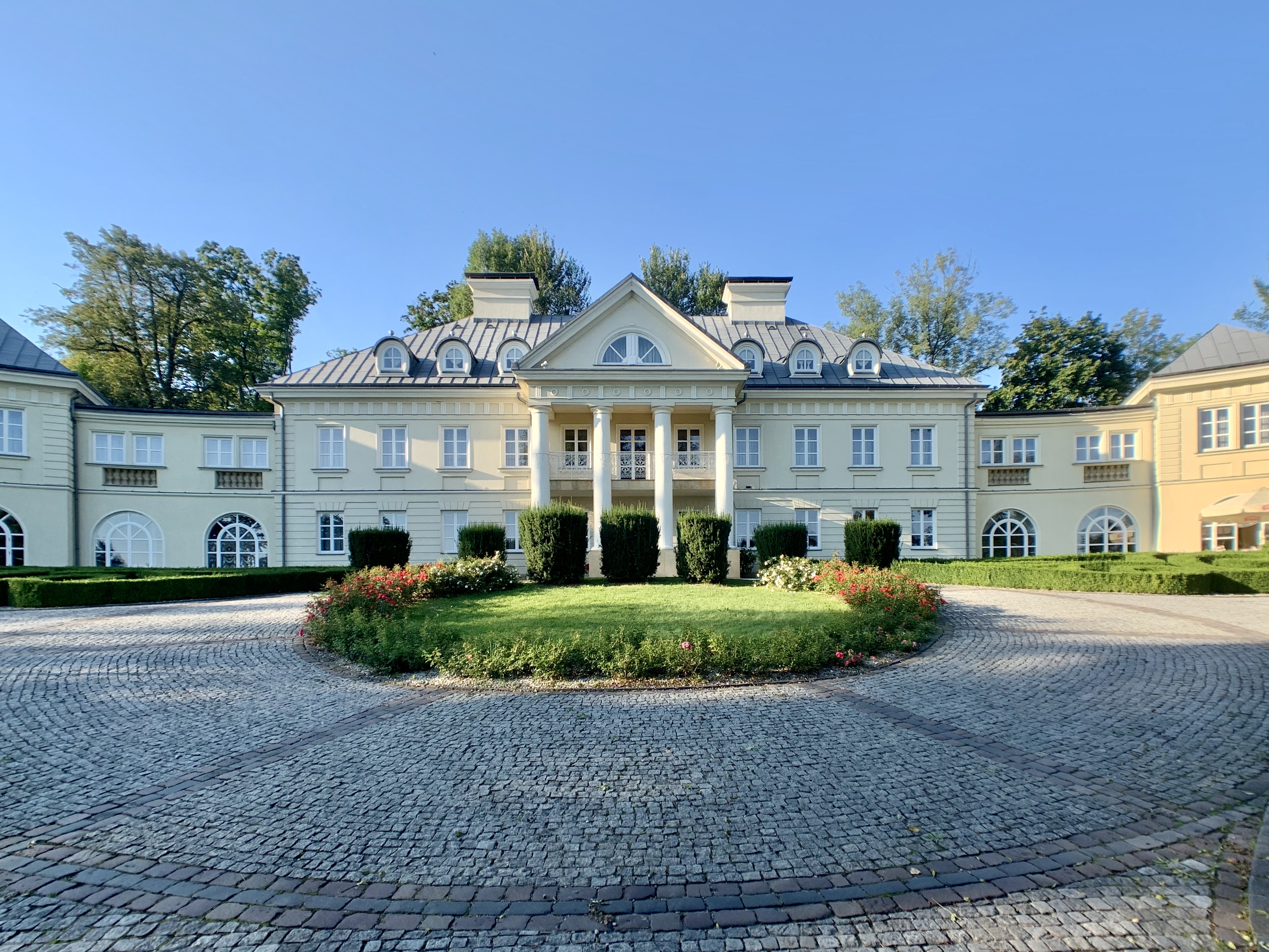
- Palace in Śmiłowice

- Location within Poland
- Coordinates: 50°08′42″N 20°26′54″E
- Country: Poland
- Voivodeship: Lesser Poland
- County: Proszowice
- Gmina: Nowe Brzesko

Śmiłowice [ɕmiwɔˈvit͡sɛ] a village in the administrative district of Gmina Nowe Brzesko, within Proszowice County, Lesser Poland Voivodeship, in southern Poland.
