= Janowice, Miechów County =

Janowice
- Village
- Location within Poland
- Coordinates: 50°23′14″N 20°12′40″E
- Country: Poland
- Voivodeship: Lesser Poland
- County: Miechów
- Gmina: Słaboszów
- Population: 300
- Website: www.janowice.prv.pl

Janowice [janɔˈvit͡sɛ] is a village in the administrative district of Gmina Słaboszów, within Miechów County, Lesser Poland Voivodeship, in southern Poland.
