= Henriette Davidis =

German cookbook author

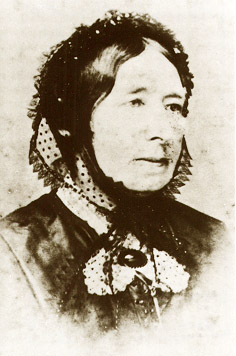
- Davidis, c. 1860
- Born: Johanna Friederika Henriette Katharina Davidis; 1 March 1801; Wengern, Holy Roman Empire
- Died: 3 April 1876 (aged 75); Dortmund, North Rhine-Westfalia
- Occupation: Cookbook author

Johanna Friederika Henriette Katharina Davidis (1 March 1801 in Wengern – 3 April 1876 in Dortmund) was a German cookbook writer. Although many similar cookbooks had been published by then, amongst others Sophie Wilhelmine Scheibler's Allgemeines deutsches Kochbuch für bürgerliche Haushaltungen in several editions, Davidis' Praktisches Kochbuch (Practical Cookbook) became the reference cookbook of the late 19th and early 20th century, a standard in German households. The large number of second-hand copies still available, frequently heavily annotated, are proof that the books were in much use. In many families Praktisches Kochbuch was handed down through the generations.

However, the cookbook was only one facet of the extensive educational program Davidis devised for young women. Starting with the Puppenköchin (Dolls' Cook) for very young girls on to young unmarried women, and finally housewives responsible for their own household and servants, Davidis' books offered advice and information. This was rooted in the conviction that being a housewife was a demanding activity in its own right for which young women of the middle class emerging at the time were frequently ill-prepared.

While authoring her books Davidis first worked as a home economist, teacher, and governess, but later on concentrated exclusively on writing. Although her books, in particular Praktisches Kochbuch which had reached its 21st edition when she died, were hugely successful even during her lifetime, she had to live very modestly and only at the age of 74 years was able to afford her own flat. Occasionally sources claim "Henriette Davidis" to be the pseudonym used by a certain Helena Clemen. However Helena Clemen was one of Davidis' readers who had sent in suggestions which the author used in her writings.

Today the Henriette-Davidis-Museum in Wetter-Wengern keeps her memory alive with cookbook exhibitions and a monograph series. Parts of a stone-built stove from the Wengern vicary together with a memorial plaque were bricked in the local railway bridge abutments, completed in 1934 and for which the vicary had to be demolished. Due to her huge influence on German food culture and household management she is generally considered to be the German equivalent to Mrs Beeton. The first edition of her classic cookbook Praktisches Kochbuch für die gewöhnliche und feinere Küche was published in 1844 and there were at least seventy-six editions published by 1963.

== Life ==
=== Youth and upbringing ===
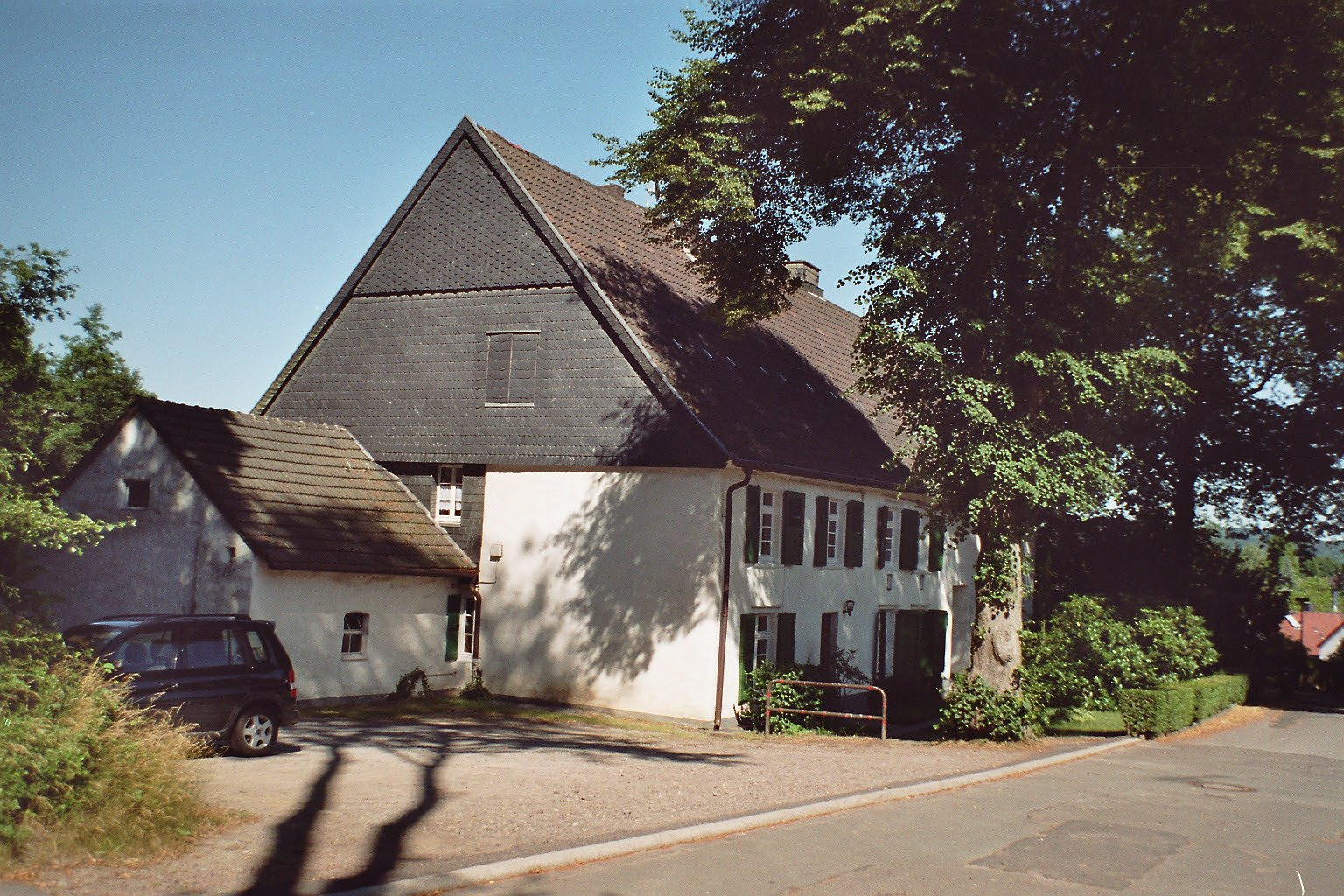
birthplace of Henriette Davidis in Wengern

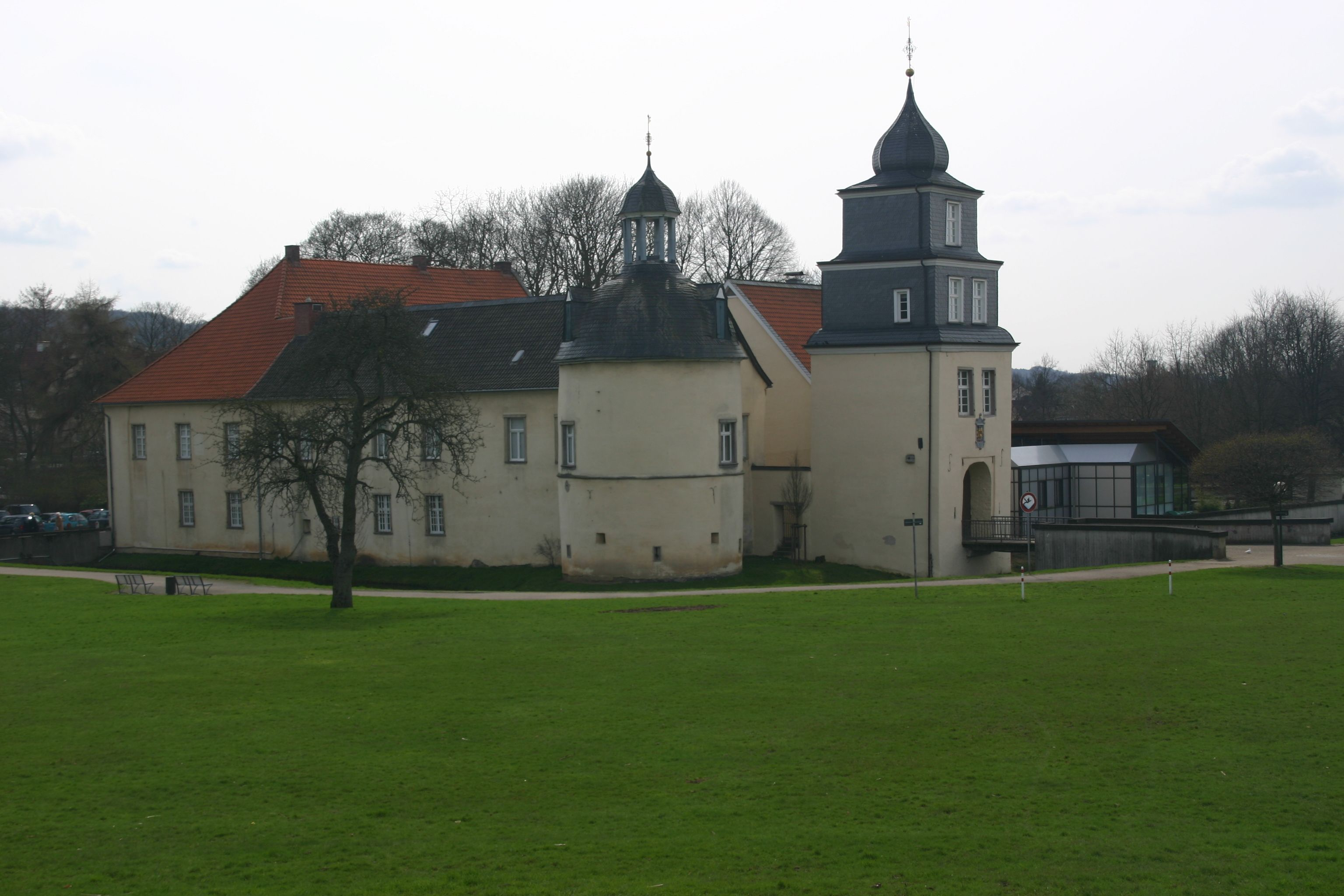
Haus Martfeld near Schwelm. Henriette lived there from 1816 to 1818 with her sister Elisabeth.

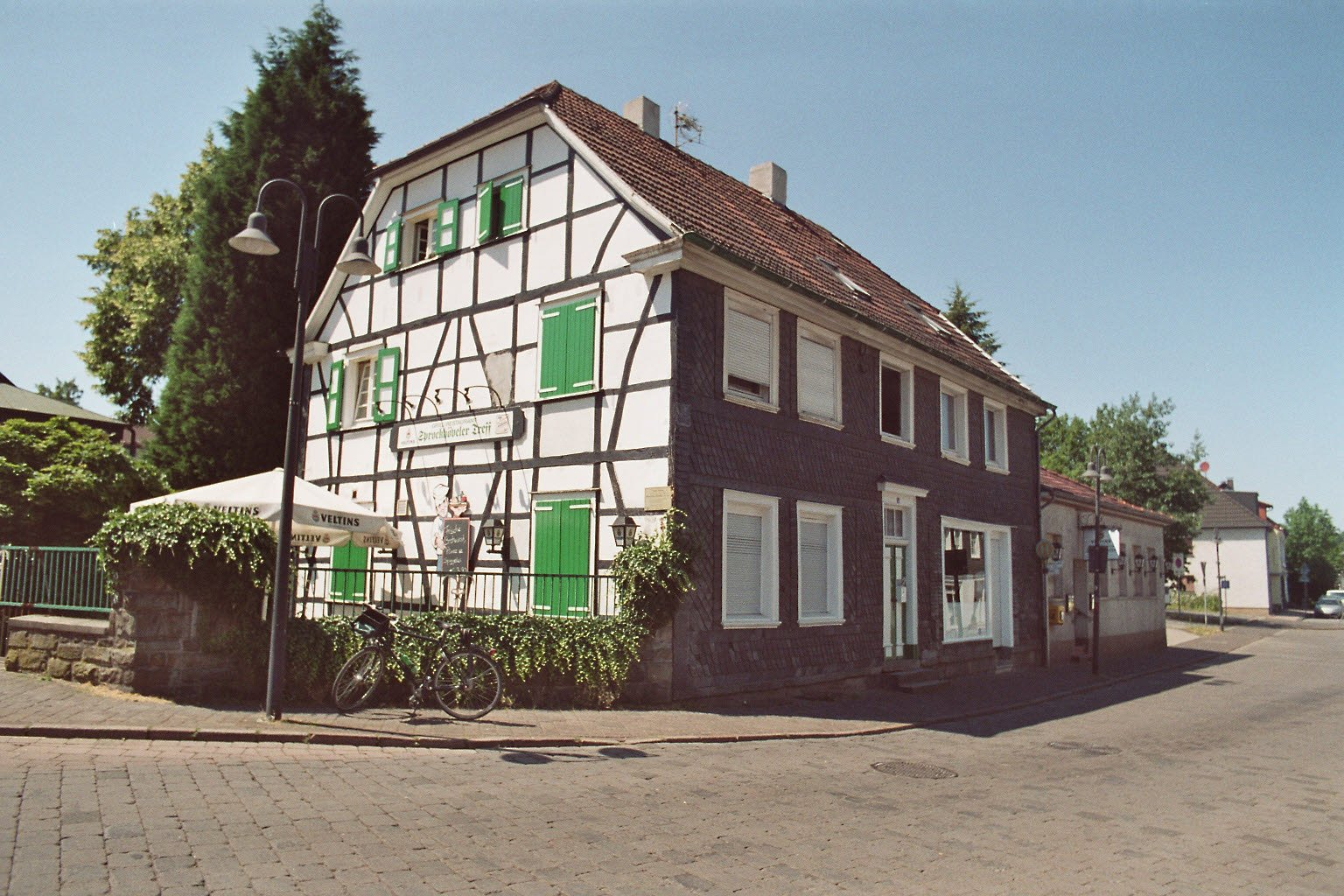
Haus Heine: Here Henriette Davidis lived during her time in Sprockhövel (1841–1848), the period during which Praktisches Kochbuch was published.

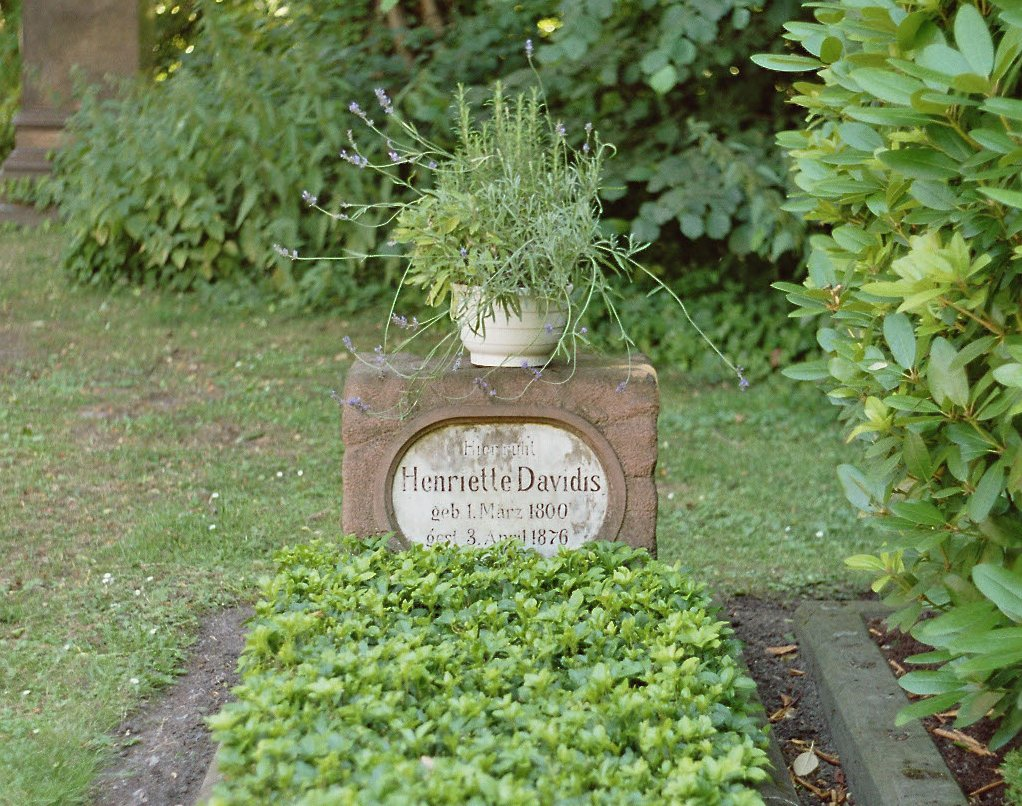
Grave on Dortmund's Ostenfriedhof

Davidis was born in 1801 in Westfalen, Wengern on the Ruhr river, today a part of the town of Wetter (Ruhr), as the tenth of thirteen children of the vicar Ernst Heinrich Davidis and his Dutch wife Maria Katharina Litthauer. Ernst Heinrich Davidis had been ordained in 1780 in Amsterdam, had been working for nine years as a garrison's preacher in the Dutch town of Breda before accepting a posting as assistant vicar in Wengern. In 1792 he took over the vicarage.

Following her confirmation, Davidis in 1816 left her parents' house and moved in with her older sister Elisabeth who lived in Schwelm, then also part of the Kingdom of Prussia. Elisabeth was married to the lord of the manor of Haus Martfeld. For two years, Davidis attended the private girls' college in Schwelm, before returning to her parents' home in 1818 and changing to another private girls' college. Later on she moved to Bommern to live with her sister Albertine, helping with the running of their estate and the upbringing of Albertine's four children. When Davidis' father died in 1828, she returned to Wengern to look after her mother until her death in 1838. Following this, she accompanied a sick gentlewoman on a trip to Switzerland before taking residence in Windheim around 1840.

From 1841 to 1848 Davidis worked at Haus Heine in Sprockhövel as a teacher at a free, so-called "working school". During that time her Praktisches Kochbuch. Zuverlässige und selbstgeprüfte Recepte der gewöhnlichen und feineren Küche (Practical Cookbook. Reliable and self-tested Recipes for the ordinary and refined Kitchen) was published, followed in 1847 and 1848 by Arrangements zu kleinen und größeren Gesellschaften and Praktische Anweisung zur Bereitung des Roßfleisches (Arrangements for smaller and larger parties/Practical instruction for the preparation of horse meat), both later merged into Praktisches Kochbuch. For Praktisches Kochbuch Davidis had been doing substantial research and collected recipes for a long time.

=== Working as teacher and author ===
After her time in Sprockhövel, Henriette Davidis worked in Bremen as a teacher and governess. In 1855, she moved back in with her sister Albertine in Bommern, staying until 1857. During those years she seems to have decided, possibly inspired by the cookbook's success, to write a more comprehensive home economics manual, in addition merely a book of recipes, as well as educational essays for young girls and women. In 1850 Der Gemüsegarten (the vegetable garden) was published as part I of a planned Vollständiges Haushaltsbuch (complete household book), in the same year she also composed an unpublished book on sick-nursing, 1856 followed Puppenköchin Anna (doll cook Anna), 1857 Die Jungfrau (the virgin) und 1858 Puppenmutter Anna (doll mother Anna). The planned multi-volume home economics manual was never completed. In 1861, after a volume of poems and novella, Die Hausfrau. Praktische Anleitung zur selbständigen und sparsamen Führung des Haushaltes (the housewife. Practical instruction for self-reliant and economical housekeeping), which was the final volume in her educational program for young housewives.

Davidis moved to Dortmund in May 1857 where she first lived as a lodger before renting her own flat. Finally she seemed to be able to make a living from her publications. Besides working on "Jungfrau" and "Hausfrau" she revised earlier works which sold well, for revised new editions. From the 1860s on Davidis, by now surely a recognized authority on home economics, also contributed on a regular basis to magazines, such as Daheim, a publication modelled on the immensely popular magazine Gartenlaube directed at a bourgeois middle class audience and published from 1865 to 1944. During this time Davidis also published two smaller pamphlets: Diätetik für Hausfrauen. Die Gesundheits- und Krankenpflege im Hause ... (Dietary guide for housewives. The healthcare and nursing at home) and Kraftküche von Liebig's Fleischextract für höhere und unbemittelte Verhältnisse (strength cookery of Liebig's meat extract for higher and penniless circumstances). The latter was a promotional brochure commissioned by the Liebig company which cleverly combined praise for the newly developed Liebig meat extract with Davidis' expert stamp of approval.

== Works ==
"Pracktisches Kochbuch für die gewöhnliche und feinere Küche : zuverlässige u. selbstgeprüfte Recepte ...", 3st ed, 1847 PDF, 471 p. 28 MB

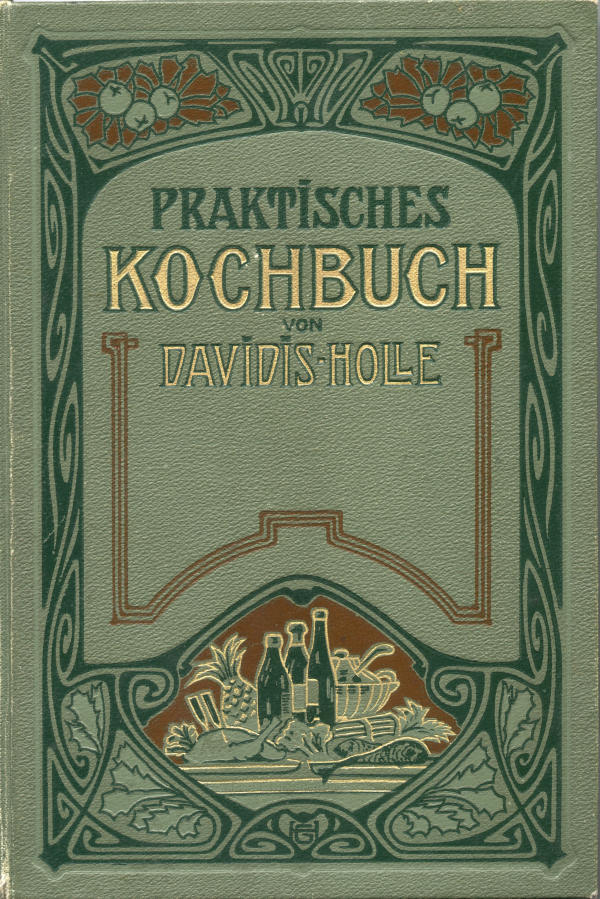
Davidis cookbook, 41st ed., 1904

- Praktisches Kochbuch für die gewöhnliche und feinere Küche, 1845
- Beruf der Jungfrau, 1857
- Puppenköchin Anna, 1857
- Puppenmutter Anna, 1858
- Praktisches Kochbuch für die Deutschen in Amerika, 1879, entered into Office of the Librarian of Congress by Geo.(Georg) Brumder
