= Przybysławice, Proszowice County =

Przybysławice
- Village
- Location within Poland
- Coordinates: 50°08′47″N 20°20′53″E
- Country: Poland
- Voivodeship: Lesser Poland
- County: Proszowice
- Gmina: Nowe Brzesko

Przybysławice [pʂɨbɨswaˈvit͡sɛ] is a village in the administrative district of Gmina Nowe Brzesko, within Proszowice County, Lesser Poland Voivodeship, in southern Poland.
