= Hebdów =

- Village
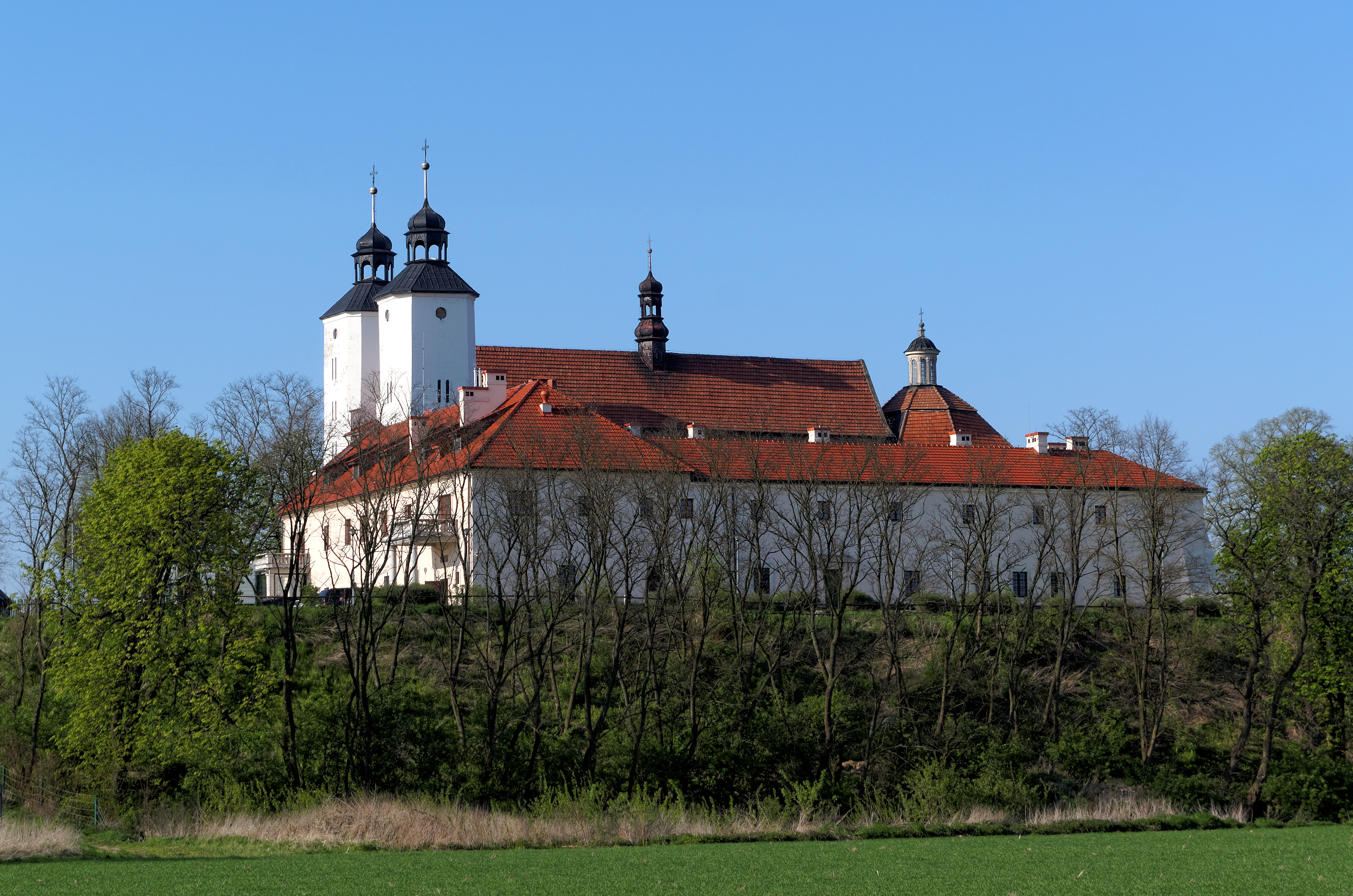
- Abbey church in Hebdów

- Location within Poland
- Coordinates: 50°9′N 20°25′E
- Country: Poland
- Voivodeship: Lesser Poland
- County: Proszowice
- Gmina: Nowe Brzesko

Hebdów [ˈxɛbduf] is a village in the administrative district of Gmina Nowe Brzesko, within Proszowice County, Lesser Poland Voivodeship, in southern Poland.

Hebdów is famous across the region for its Norbertine Abbey, which was founded in the first half of the 12th century (one of the bells at the abbey bears the date 1108). The historic complex (the abbey together with a church) currently belongs to the Piarists. It is home to a sanctuary of Our Lady of Hebdów (Matka Boska Hebdowska), and the 45-meter tall towers of the church are visible from a large distance.

The history of the abbey dates back to the year 1146, when two knights of High Duke of Poland, Bolesław IV the Curly, invited here Premonstratensian monks from Strahov Monastery in the Kingdom of Bohemia. The abbey at Hebdów became a branch of the Czech monastery, with first monks having been of Czech origin, and the first abbot a German man named Wosolanus, who died in 1179. Originally, both monks and nuns lived at Hebdów. After some time however, Norbertine nuns moved to the village of Zwierzyniec, which now is a district of Kraków. In 1279, wójt Gotfryd of Ślezino founded the town of Nowe Brzesko, located only three kilometers from Hebdów. The town remained property of the monastery until the 19th century. In the Middle Ages, Hebdów Abbey emerged as a regional center of the Norbertines. It controlled other abbeys, at Witów, Nowy Sącz, Zwierzyniec, Imbramowice, Busko Zdrój, Płock and Krzyżanowice.

The decline of the abbey was brought about by the Protestant Reformation. Furthermore, the abbots at Hebdów were selected by Polish Kings, which had negative consequences, as they were more interested in profits than in spiritual discipline of their monks. In the mid-17th century, the church was expanded by abbot Ludwik Stępkowski, who later became the Bishop of Kamieniec Podolski. Several new ornaments, altars and paintings were added to the church at that time, including the so-called Oratorio Chapel. The new, remodelled church was blessed by Bishop Mikołaj Oborski on May 31, 1678.

After the Partitions of Poland Hebdów briefly belonged to the Habsburg Empire, and in 1815 it became part of Russian-controlled Congress Poland, in which it remained until World War I. In 1819, Russians took control over the complex, taking away the abbey’s library, with its precious collection of ancient prints and books. In 1859 the church burned, and services were temporarily moved to Nowe Brzesko. Since 1949, the complex has been administered by the Piarists. Arguably, the most famous of the Hebdów abbots was Józef Andrzej Załuski.
