= Wetter (Ruhr) =

- Town
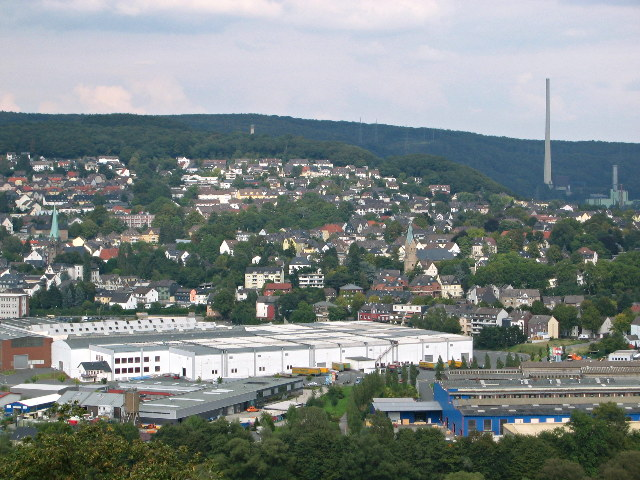
- Alt-Wetter

- Coat of arms

- Location of Wetter within Ennepe-Ruhr-Kreis district
- Interactive map of Wetter
- Location within Germany Location within North Rhine-Westphalia
- Coordinates: 51°23′17″N 07°23′42″E
- Country: Germany
- State: North Rhine-Westphalia
- Admin. region: Arnsberg
- District: Ennepe-Ruhr-Kreis

Government
  - Mayor (2020–25): Frank Hasenberg (SPD)

Area
  - Total: 31.54 km^{2} (12.18 sq mi)
- Elevation: 110 m (360 ft)

Population (2025-12-31)
  - Total: 25,959
  - Density: 823.1/km^{2} (2,132/sq mi)
- Time zone: UTC+01:00 (CET)
  - Summer (DST): UTC+02:00 (CEST)
- Postal codes: 58300
- Dialling codes: 02335
- Vehicle registration: EN, WIT
- Website: www.stadt-wetter.de

Wetter (Ruhr) (German pronunciation: [ˈvɛtɐ]) is a town in western Germany, in the federal state of North Rhine-Westphalia and the district of Ennepe-Ruhr-Kreis. The river Ruhr flows through the urban area, separating the district of Alt-Wetter from the districts of Esborn, Volmarstein and Wengern. The cities of Dortmund and Bochum are within 20 minutes by road or rail.

== Geography ==
=== Neighbour municipalities ===
Neighbour municipalities are Gevelsberg, Hagen, Herdecke, Sprockhövel and Witten. The Cities of Dortmund, Bochum, Essen and Wuppertal are near.

=== City arrangement ===
- Alt-Wetter
- Wengern
- Esborn
  - Albringhausen
- Volmarstein
  - Grundschöttel
  - Oberwengern
  - Schmandbruch

== Population ==
Historical population

| Year | Pop. | ±% p.a. |
|---|---|---|
| 1965 | 29,578 | — |
| 1970 | 30,756 | +0.78% |
| 1975 | 30,638 | −0.08% |
| 1980 | 29,845 | −0.52% |
| 1985 | 28,827 | −0.69% |
| 1990 | 28,880 | +0.04% |
| 1995 | 29,331 | +0.31% |

| Year | Pop. | ±% p.a. |
|---|---|---|
| 2000 | 29,851 | +0.35% |
| 2005 | 29,011 | −0.57% |
| 2010 | 28,113 | −0.63% |
| 2015 | 27,822 | −0.21% |
| 2020 | 27,269 | −0.40% |
| 2025 | 25,959 | −0.98% |

Source: Landesdatabank Nordrhein-Westfalen

== History ==
The town of Wetter is first documented in the year 1214 in relation with the Castle Wetter and the knights Bruno and Friedrich. Another famous castle ruin is the Castle Volmarstein which was built in the 11th century by the archbishop of Cologne Frederick I. The castle is located on the other side of the Ruhr in the district of Volmarstein which has been part of Wetter since the municipal community-reform in 1970.

In 1819 Friedrich Harkort founded the first industrial workshop at Castle Wetter, producing steam engines and gas light equipment. Thus he did not just develop education and social policy but also laid the cornerstone of the early industrialization of the Ruhr area and Germany. The reservoir between Wetter and Herdecke, Harkortsee, and the highest mountain in the area, Harkortberg, were both named after him.

Due to the lowering bombardments in 1944/45, during the Second World War, the town became the domicile of the Reichsgau south-Westfalia, originally residing in Bochum.

== Politics ==
The current mayor of Wetter is Frank Hasenberg of the Social Democratic Party (SPD) since 2007. In the most recent mayoral election on 13 and 27 September 2020, Hasenberg advanced to the runoff with 46.9% of votes against Karen Haltaufderheide of The Greens, who won 20.1%. CDU candidate Stefan Wedegärtner placed third with 16.3%, followed by the FDP's Alexander Stuckenholz (10.7%), independent Eva Holzhauer (3.7%), and Christian-Social Reformers candidate Christopher Krüger (2.3%). In the runoff, on a turnout of 40.3%, Hasenberg won with 59.7% of votes.

=== Local council ===
Results of the 2020 city council election

The Wetter city council governs the city alongside the Mayor. The most recent city council election was held on 13 September 2020, and the results were as follows:

| Party | Votes | % | +/- | Seats | +/- |
|---|---|---|---|---|---|
| Social Democratic Party (SPD) | 4,081 | 35.2 | ▼10.6 | 15 | ▼2 |
| Alliance 90/The Greens (Grüne) | 2,972 | 25.6 | ▲11.7 | 11 | ▲6 |
| Christian Democratic Union (CDU) | 2,448 | 21.1 | ▼2.3 | 9 | ▲1 |
| Free Democratic Party (FDP) | 1,114 | 9.6 | ▲5.1 | 4 | ▲2 |
| Citizens for Wetter (BfW) | 616 | 5.3 | ▲1.4 | 2 | ▲1 |
| Christian-Social Reformers (CSR) | 248 | 2.1 | New | 1 | New |
| Die PARTEI | 120 | 1.0 | New | 0 | New |
| Valid votes | 11,599 | 98.4 | | | |
| Invalid votes | 194 | 1.6 | | | |
| Total | 11,793 | 100.0 | | 42 | ▲6 |
| Electorate/voter turnout | 22,448 | 52.5 | | | |
Source: City of Wetter (Ruhr)

== Town twinnings ==
Wetter is twinned with South Elmsall (England), Turawa (Poland) and Stadtilm (Germany).

== Culture and objects of interest ==
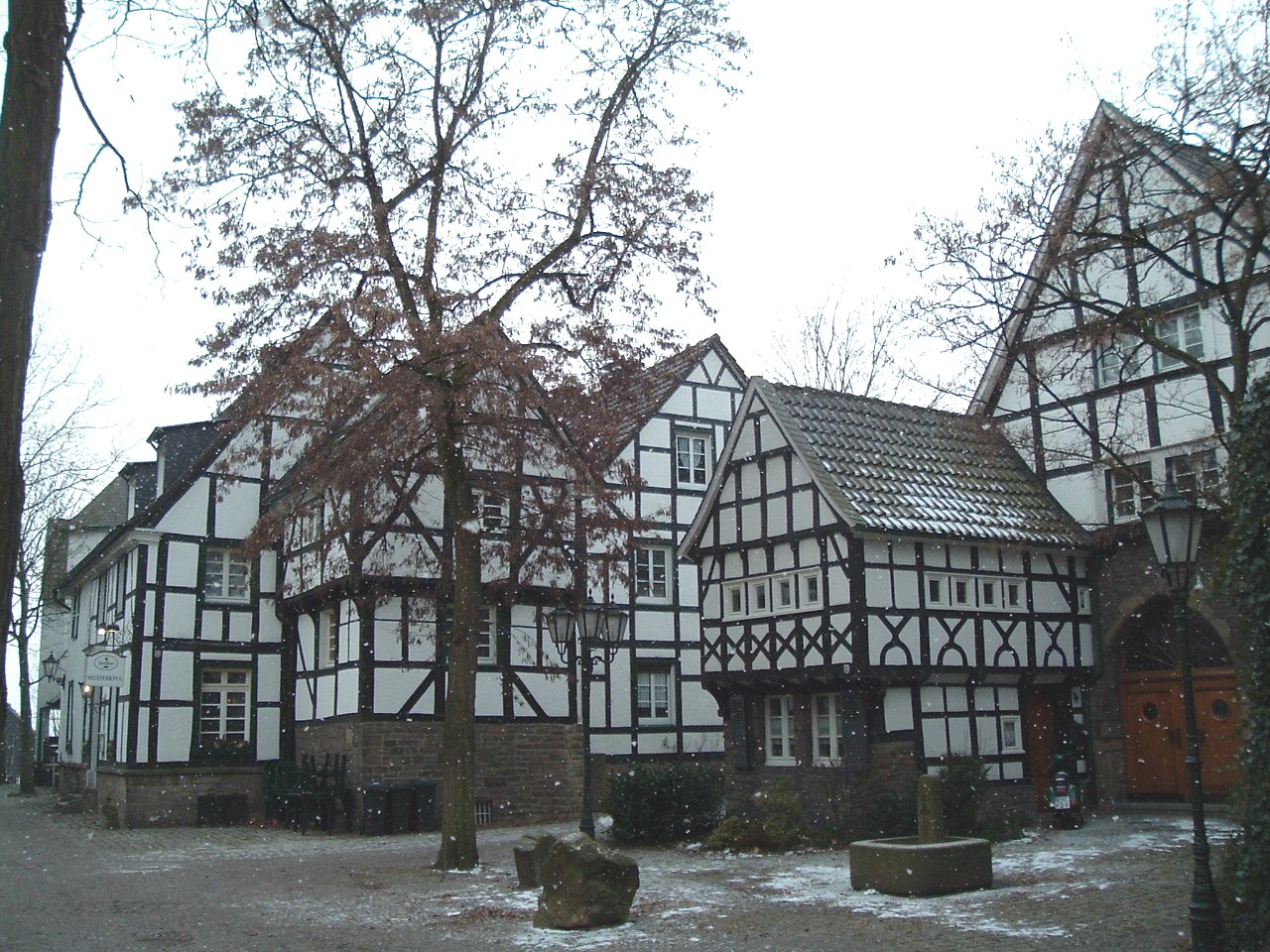
The "Fünf-Giebel-Eck" (Five-Gable-Corner) in Wetter

=== Objects of interest ===
- Harkortsee (Lake Harkort). Starting point for walks, bicycle- and Inlineskating tours around the two ruhr lakes Harkortsee and Hengsteysee (Lake Hengstey).
- Harkortberg. Starting point of extensive walking-tours through the Ardeygebirge with good view on the Harkort lake. Here also is located the Harkort-Tower, a far away visible registration number of Wetter.
- Henriette Davidis museum. Life and work of the most famous German cooking book author.
- Model of planets in Wetter, the center is located at the local High School in Wetter.

== Notable people ==
- Henriette Davidis, Today the Henriette-Davidis-museum reminds visitors of her
- Friedrich Harkort, German entrepreneur and politician in the early days of the industrialisation of the Ruhr area
- Hoffmann von Fallersleben, German poet, best known for writing the national anthem of Germany
- Freiherr vom Stein was between 1784 and 1793 headmaster of the mining-office in Wetter. He restructured the accountancy and is considered as the initiator of the municipal self-administration
- Eduard Scheve (1836–?), in the district of Volmarstein was the originator of the deaconry of the Fellowship of the Protestant Free Churches.

== Economy ==
- Demag Cranes & Components GmbH
- Taprogge GmbH
- ABUS
- Burg Wächter (locks)
- 23 Base Workshop REME - Refurbishing British Military Equipment
