= Maciejów, Lesser Poland Voivodeship =

Village in Poland

Maciejów
- Village
- Location within Poland
- Coordinates: 50°24′3″N 20°12′17″E
- Country: Poland
- Voivodeship: Lesser Poland
- County: Miechów
- Gmina: Słaboszów
- Population: 150

Maciejów [maˈt͡ɕɛjuf] is a village located in the administrative district of Gmina Słaboszów, within Miechów County, in the Lesser Poland Voivodeship, in southern Poland.
