= Taprogge =

Medium-sized company

Coordinates: 51°23′37″N 7°21′15″E

Taprogge GmbH
- Type: Medium-sized company
- Industry: Industrial engineering, Water technology
- Founded: 1953; 73 years ago
- Founders: Ludwig Taprogge, Josef Taprogge
- Headquarters: Wetter, Germany
- Area served: Worldwide
- Products: Tube cleaning systems heat exchanger debris filters water intake systems (TAPIS)
- Website: taprogge.de

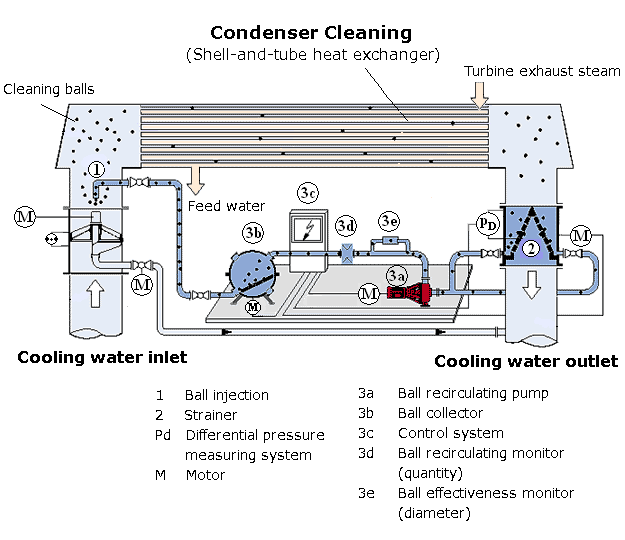
Schematic representation of the cleaning process and of the filtration technology

Taprogge GmbH is a medium-sized company based in Wetter, Germany. The company is named after founding brothers Ludwig and Josef Taprogge. Founded in 1953, the company is known for its tube cleaning systems for steam turbine condensers, heat exchangers and debris filters for water-cooled shell and tube heat exchangers and condensers.

== Invention of the tube cleaning system ==
Josef Taprogge was a turbine engineer in a power plant nearby Essen and was responsible for the cleaning of the turbine condenser tubes. Cleaning had to be performed while the turbine was out of operation, with the power station not being able to supply any electrical energy to the grid during the turbine outage. On the other hand, the careful elimination of fouling from inside of the tubing is important for a high vacuum in the condenser and thereby for the optimal efficiency of the energy generation through water vapour. He generated patents for these self-cleaning systems in 1953 and 1957.

To avoid economic losses caused by shutdowns, Josef Taprogge invented a continuously working cleaning system which kept the condenser free from fouling during the operation of the steam turbine. A prototype was installed into the cooling water pipe leading to the condenser. During the time of the German Wirtschaftswunder, the process which was marketed and further developed by Taprogge GmbH was widespread and very well received in the power stations due to its efficiency. The efficiency of the power stations that are equipped with the systems increases by around 2 – 4%. The cleaning process became well known and the name "Taprogge System" has been used in the technical literature.

== Tube cleaning systems ==
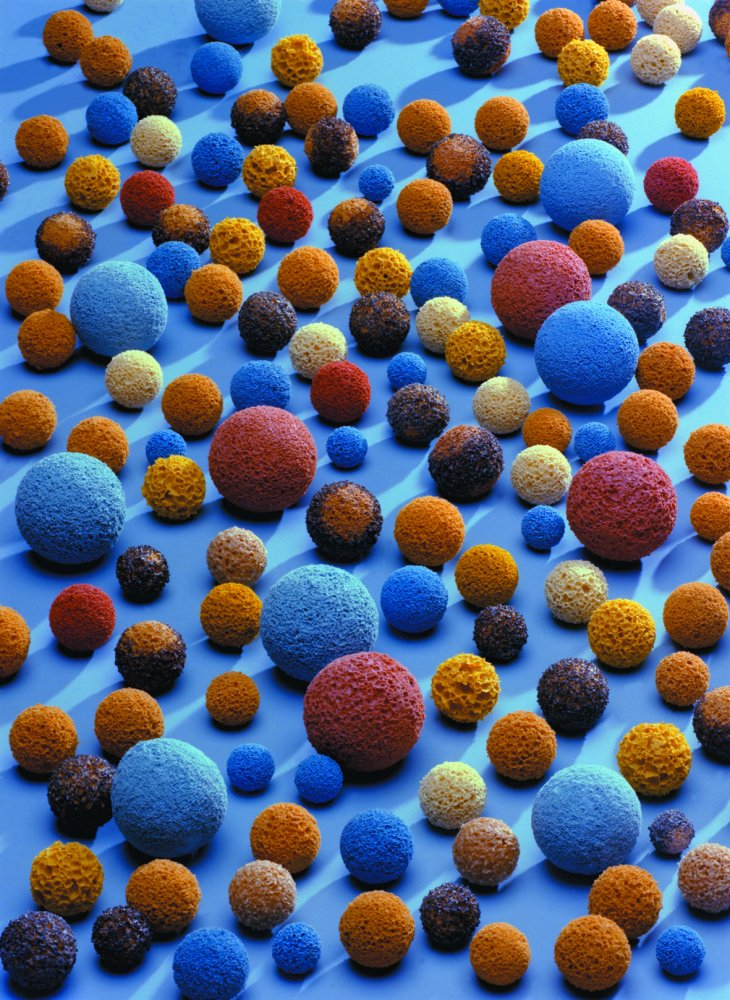
A typical assortment of cleaning balls

The patented process uses sponge rubber balls which are injected into the cooling water flow before it enters into the condenser. The diameter of the cleaning balls is only slightly bigger than the nominal diameter of the condenser tubing. Due to their elasticity they generate a contact pressure on their way through the condenser tubes by which fouling is removed from the inner tube walls. At the condenser outlet a strainer which separates the balls from the water flow and feeds them back to their starting point. The cleaning ball diameters range from 14 to 30 mm and filling one collector normally requires several hundred of them. However, some cleaning systems can require well over a thousand cleaning balls. The lifetime of the cleaning balls which are produced of biodegradable natural rubber is around 4 weeks.

A specialized technology is the production of tube cleaning systems for seawater desalination plants. As the heated seawater called brine has a particularly corrosive effect, excellent corrosion resistant yet heat conducting materials (like Titanium) have to be used for such systems. Due to the large tube diameters in the evaporators, the cleaning balls have diameters of up to 45 mm.

== Debris filtration systems ==
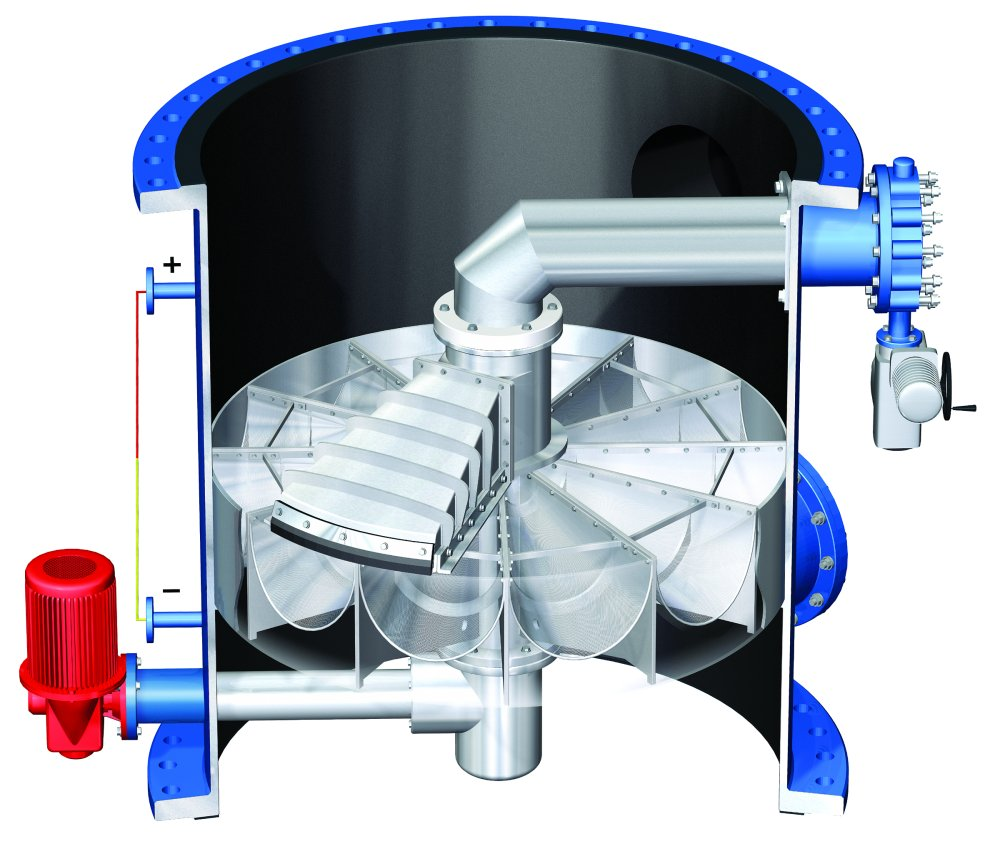
Backwash filter with large nominal diameter

In the 1970s, the product range was extended by backwash filters to protect the heat exchangers and condensers of power stations and industrial plants from macro fouling, like stones, pieces of wood, fibres, plastic sheeting, and mussels that settle on the filter surface. To clean by backwashing, an electrically driven rotor draws off accumulated fouling for discharge to the main cooling water pipe or a debris container. This filter surface consists of stainless steel with punched holes. For difficult types of debris, filter surfaces of plastic or grids can be used.

== Water intake systems ==
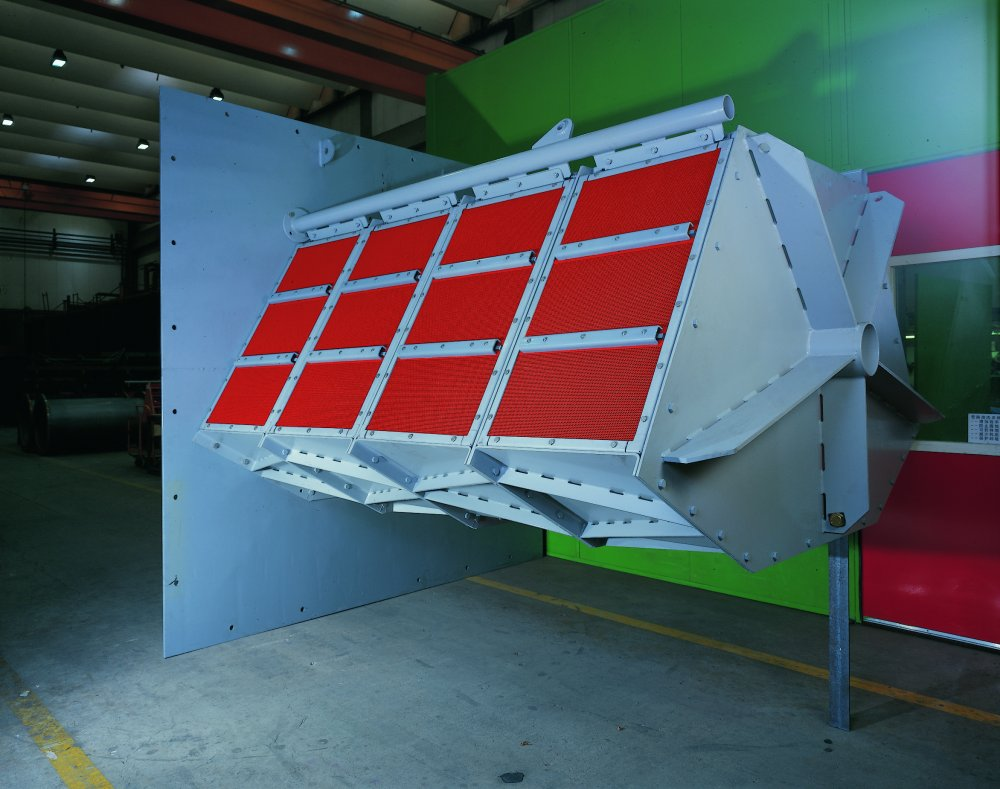
Airflushed intake filter called TAPIS

Since the late 1990s, Taprogge offers another filter system which retains fouling already at the intake into the cooling water system – in this way the entire system and the long cooling water pipes can be protected. The system called TAPIS (Taprogge Air Powered Intake System) is installed in the water at the cooling water pipe inlet in the form of a polyhedral housing with plain filter surfaces. It is cleaned by pressurized air blast. In contrast to submarine rakes for seaborne matter, the stainless steel filter has no moving parts and masters biggest water flows. The filter surfaces are made of coated plastic provided with drilled holes.

== Ball release ==
In 2023 and 2026, Taprogge balls used to clean the Hartlepool nuclear power station's cooling systems were released and appeared on beaches across Teesside. Power station operator EDF Energy said the balls are biodegradable and releases were being reduced, but any found balls should be reported to the company or the Environment Agency.

== Literature ==
- Heat Exchanger Fouling, Fundamental Approaches and Technical Solutions; Editor: Prof.Dr.-Ing. Hans Mueller-Steinhagen ISBN 3-934736-00-9.
