= Majkowice, Proszowice County =

Majkowice
- Village
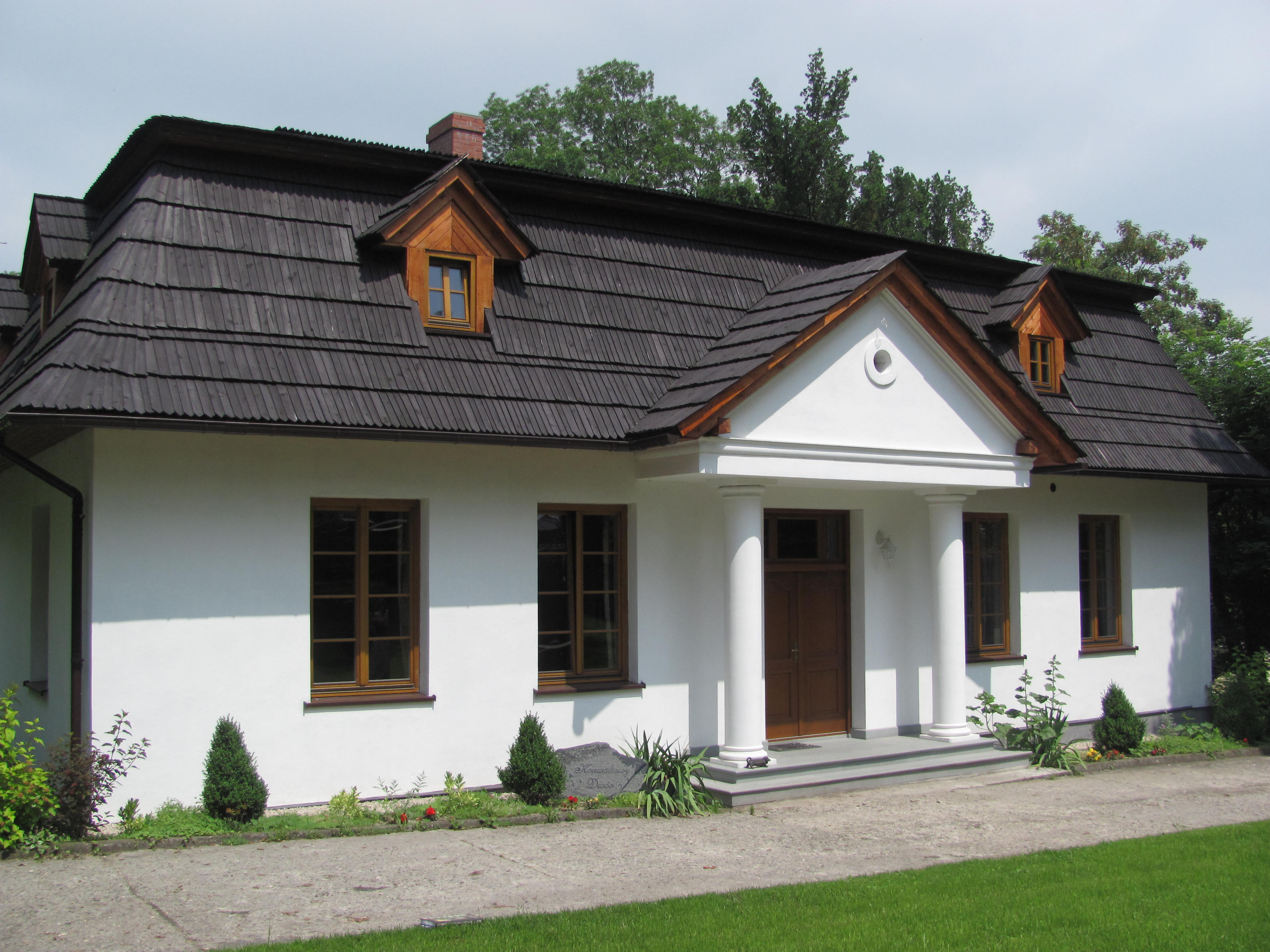
- Majkowice Manor House

- Location within Poland
- Coordinates: 50°10′17″N 20°28′36″E
- Country: Poland
- Voivodeship: Lesser Poland
- County: Proszowice
- Gmina: Nowe Brzesko

Majkowice [mai̯kɔˈvit͡sɛ] is a village in the administrative district of Gmina Nowe Brzesko, within Proszowice County, Lesser Poland Voivodeship, in southern Poland.
