= Słaboszów =

- Village
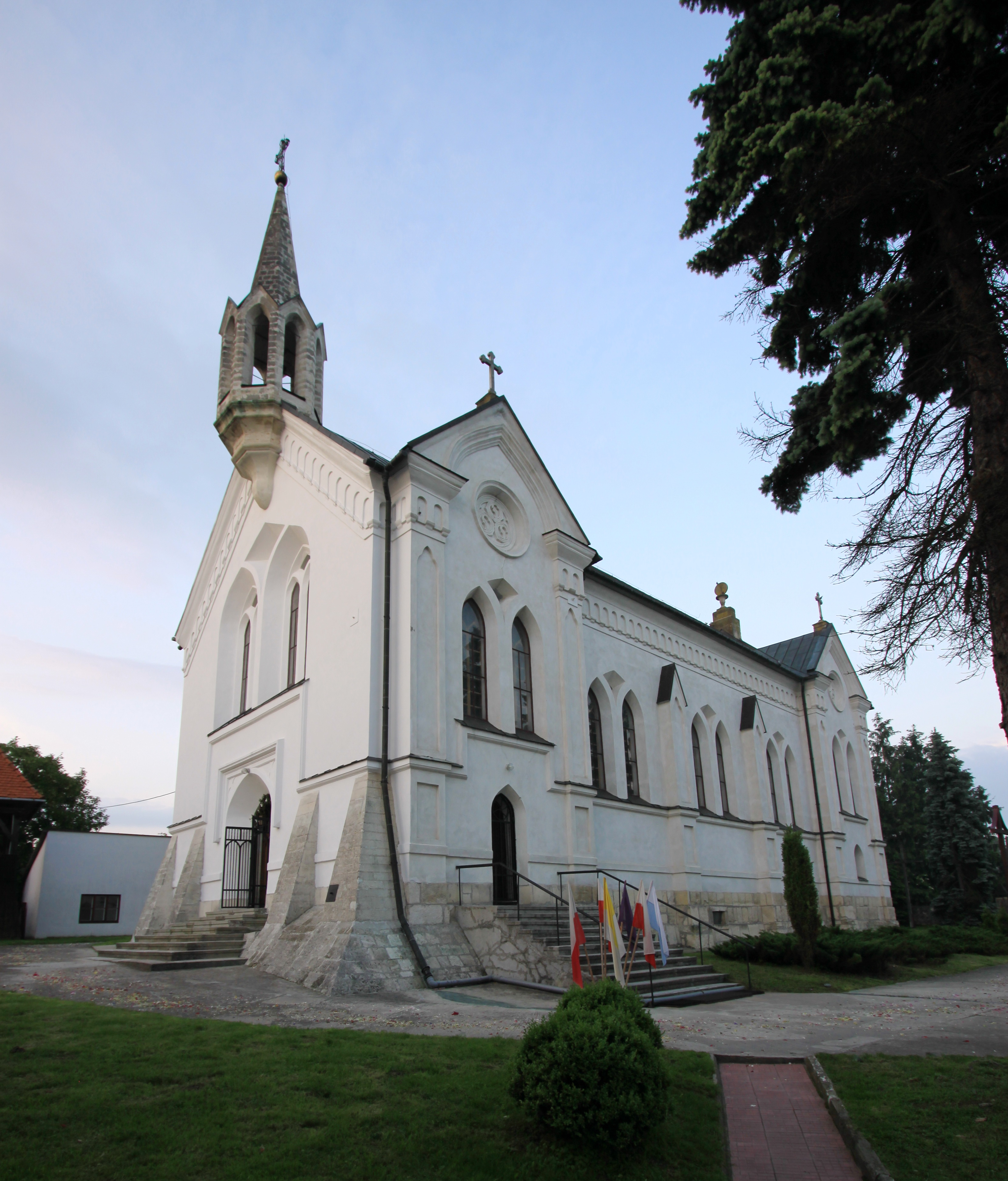
- Church of Saint Nicholas

- Location within Poland
- Coordinates: 50°23′15″N 20°16′29″E
- Country: Poland
- Voivodeship: Lesser Poland
- County: Miechów
- Gmina: Słaboszów

Population
  - Total: 340

Słaboszów [swaˈbɔʂuf] is a village in Miechów County, Lesser Poland Voivodeship, in southern Poland. It is the seat of the gmina (administrative district) called Gmina Słaboszów.

It is the birthplace of Auschwitz survivor and escapee Jerzy Bielecki.
