= Jazdowice =

- Village
- Location within Poland
- Coordinates: 50°21′52″N 20°19′24″E
- Country: Poland
- Voivodeship: Lesser Poland
- County: Miechów
- Gmina: Słaboszów
- Population: 130

Jazdowice [jazdɔˈvit͡sɛ] is a village in the administrative district of Gmina Słaboszów, within Miechów County, Lesser Poland Voivodeship, in southern Poland.
