= Mniszów =

- Village
- Location within Poland
- Coordinates: 50°9′17″N 20°22′17″E
- Country: Poland
- Voivodeship: Lesser Poland
- County: Proszowice
- Gmina: Nowe Brzesko

Mniszów [ˈmniʂuf] is a village in the administrative district of Gmina Nowe Brzesko, within Proszowice County, Lesser Poland Voivodeship, in southern Poland.
