= Sierosławice, Lesser Poland Voivodeship =

Sierosławice
- Village
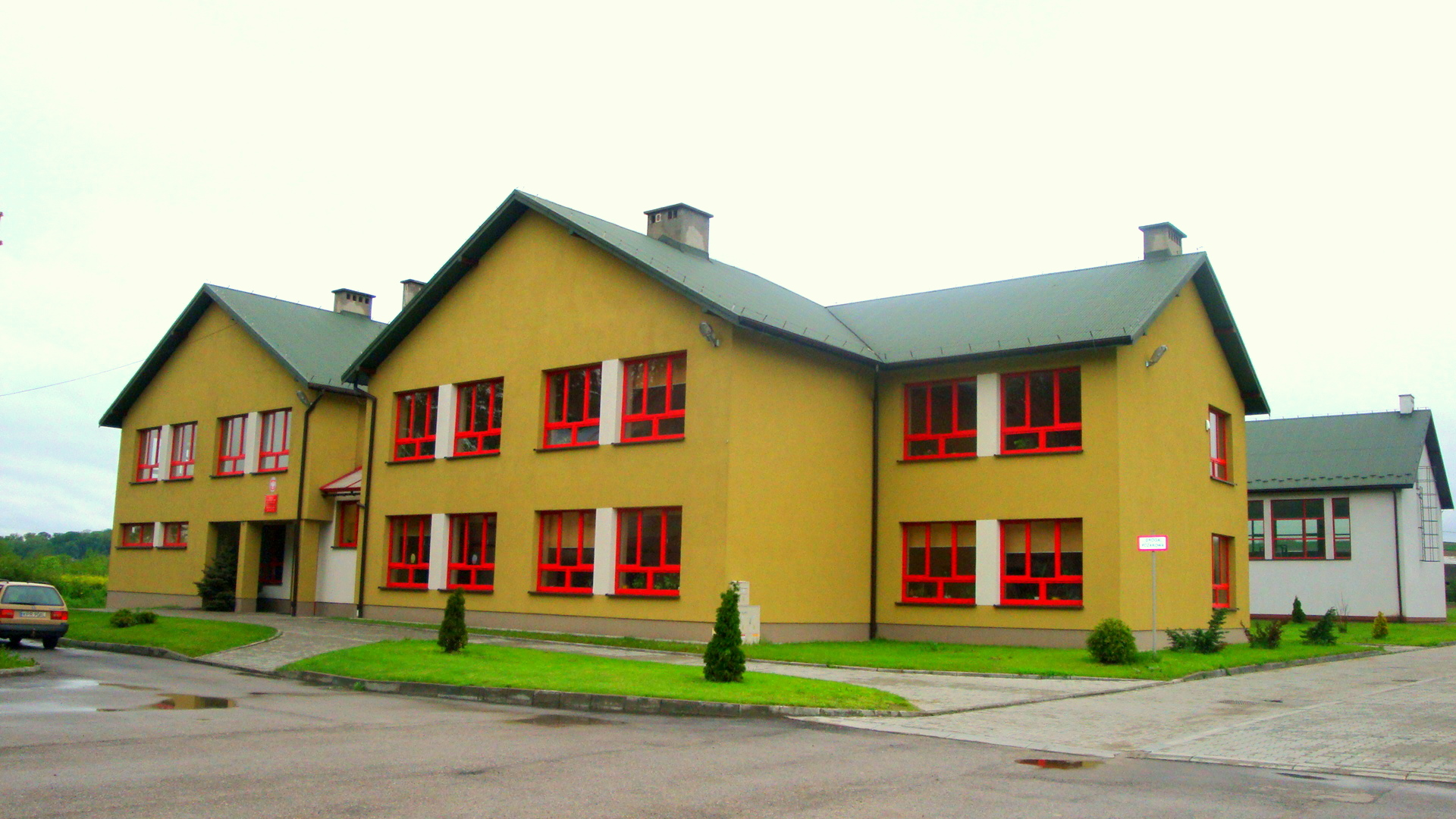
- School and Junior High School Complex in Sierosławice

- Location within Poland
- Coordinates: 50°08′39″N 20°27′54″E
- Country: Poland
- Voivodeship: Lesser Poland
- County: Proszowice
- Gmina: Nowe Brzesko

Sierosławice [ɕɛrɔswaˈvit͡sɛ] is a village in the administrative district of Gmina Nowe Brzesko, within Proszowice County, Lesser Poland Voivodeship, in southern Poland.
