= Kuchary, Lesser Poland Voivodeship =

Kuchary
- Village
- Location within Poland
- Coordinates: 50°10′00″N 20°27′12″E
- Country: Poland
- Voivodeship: Lesser Poland
- County: Proszowice
- Gmina: Nowe Brzesko

Kuchary [kuˈxarɨ] is a village in the administrative district of Gmina Nowe Brzesko, within Proszowice County, Lesser Poland Voivodeship, in southern Poland.
