= Wymysłów, Gmina Słaboszów =

Wymysłów
- Village
- Location within Poland
- Coordinates: 50°24′53″N 20°16′57″E
- Country: Poland
- Voivodeship: Lesser Poland
- County: Miechów
- Gmina: Słaboszów

Wymysłów [vɨˈmɨswuf] is a village in the administrative district of Gmina Słaboszów, within Miechów County, Lesser Poland Voivodeship, in southern Poland.
