= Mniszów-Kolonia =

- Village
- Location within Poland
- Coordinates: 50°10′21″N 20°23′04″E
- Country: Poland
- Voivodeship: Lesser Poland
- County: Proszowice
- Gmina: Nowe Brzesko
- Population (approx.): 160

Mniszów-Kolonia [ˈmniʂuf kɔˈlɔɲa] is a village in the administrative district of Gmina Nowe Brzesko, within Proszowice County, Lesser Poland Voivodeship, in southern Poland.

The village has an approximate population of 160.
