= Nowe Brzesko =

- Town
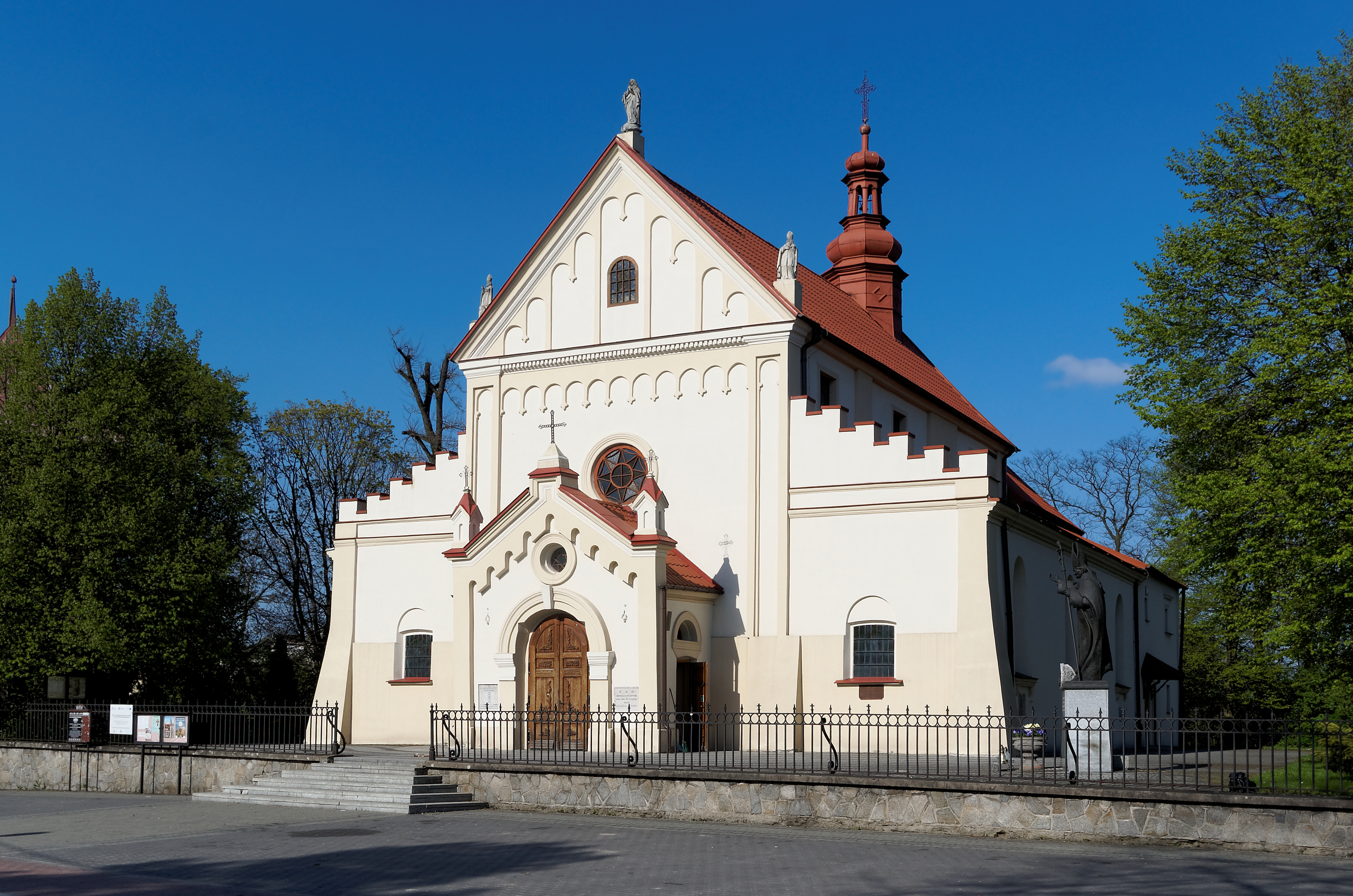
- All Saints Church

- Flag Coat of arms

- Location within Poland
- Coordinates: 50°8′14″N 20°23′5″E
- Country: Poland
- Voivodeship: Lesser Poland
- County: Proszowice
- Gmina: Nowe Brzesko
- Town rights: 1279

Population (2011 official census)
  - Total: 1,662
- Time zone: UTC+1 (CET)
  - Summer (DST): UTC+2 (CEST)

Nowe Brzesko [ˈnɔvɛ ˈbʐɛskɔ] is a town in Proszowice County, Lesser Poland Voivodeship, in southern Poland. It is the seat of the gmina (administrative district) called Gmina Nowe Brzesko. According to 2011 official census Nowe Brzesko has population of 1662.

== History ==
Nowe Brzesko was first mentioned in the first half of the 13th century. The village belonged to the Bishops of Kraków, who handed it to the Norbertine abbey from nearby Hebdów. On October 6, 1279, it became a town, and its first known wójt was Gotfryd, the son of Arnold from Ślesin. Due to several privileges, the town quickly developed, but in the first half of the 15th century it declined, due to a catastrophic flood of the Vistula (1442). Furthermore, in 1444-45 it was ransacked by the unpaid royal soldiers, returning to Poland after the defeat in the Battle of Varna. As a result, Nowe Brzesko, while still a town, did not differ from local villages. Artisans were few, and fairs were not organized. In 1522, King Sigismund I the Old ordered local authorities to mark boundaries of Nowe Brzesko, and create a street system, together with a market place. Town’s residents were in constant conflict with abbots from Hebdów, who tried to get rid of their privileges.

In the late 16th century, the population of Nowe Brzesko was app. 1,000. The town slowly developed, but wars of the mid-17th century (see Swedish invasion of Poland) completely destroyed it and decimated the population. Polish, Swedish, Tatar and Transilvanian soldiers stayed here, robbing and stealing. Poverty and hunger were common, and the population declined by 50%. Furthermore, conflicts with the Hebdów abbots did not end, and residents of the town were forced to work for the abbey (see Serfdom). In 1761, a group of inhabitants rebelled against the authority of the abbot, and asked King Stanisław August Poniatowski to support them.

The town was annexed by Austria in the Third Partition of Poland in 1795. After the Polish victory in the Austro-Polish War of 1809, it became part of the short-lived Duchy of Warsaw, and after the duchy's dissolution in 1815, it became part of Russian-controlled Congress Poland. In 1818, the abbey was dissolved, and the town, with its 151 houses and 900 residents, became state property. Located away from main roads, near the border with Austrian Galicia, the town lost its charter in 1869, becoming a village. In the Second Polish Republic, it belonged to Kielce Voivodeship.

Following the German-Soviet invasion of Poland, which started World War II in September 1939, the town was occupied by Germany. The Polish resistance movement was active in the town, including a local unit of the Home Army under the cryptonym "Bratek" ("Pansy"). On 25 July 1944, the town was liberated by Polish partisans of the Home Army, and then formed part of the short-lived Polish "Kazimierza-Proszowice Partisan Republic".

Nowe Brzesko regained town rights in 2011.
