= Kalina Wielka =

- Village
- Location within Poland
- Coordinates: 50°22′54″N 20°9′24″E
- Country: Poland
- Voivodeship: Lesser Poland
- County: Miechów
- Gmina: Słaboszów
- Population: 520

Kalina Wielka [kaˈlina ˈvjɛlka] is a village in the administrative district of Gmina Słaboszów, within Miechów County, Lesser Poland Voivodeship, in southern Poland.
