= Gmina Słaboszów =

Gmina Słaboszów Słaboszów Commune
- Gmina
- Flag Coat of arms
- Interactive map of Gmina Słaboszów
- Coordinates (Słaboszów): 50°23′15″N 20°16′29″E
- Country: Poland
- Voivodeship: Lesser Poland
- County: Miechów
- Seat: Słaboszów

Area
  - Total: 76.96 km^{2} (29.71 sq mi)

Population (2006)
  - Total: 3,839
  - Density: 49.88/km^{2} (129.2/sq mi)
- Website: http://gminaslaboszow.republika.pl

Gmina Słaboszów is a rural gmina (administrative district) in Miechów County, Lesser Poland Voivodeship, in southern Poland. Its seat is the village of Słaboszów, which lies approximately 18 kilometres (11 mi) east of Miechów and 44 km (27 mi) north-east of the regional capital Kraków.

The gmina covers an area of 76.96 square kilometres (29.7 sq mi), and as of 2006 its total population is 3,839.

== Villages ==
Gmina Słaboszów contains the villages and settlements of Buszków, Dziaduszyce, Grzymałów, Ilkowice, Janowice, Jazdowice, Kalina Wielka, Kropidło, Maciejów, Nieszków, Raszówek, Rędziny Zbigalskie, Rędziny-Borek, Rzemiędzice, Słaboszów, Śladów, Słupów, Święcice, Wymysłów and Zagorzany.

== Neighbouring gminas ==
Gmina Słaboszów is bordered by the gminas of Działoszyce, Książ Wielki, Miechów and Racławice.
