= Nieszków =

- Village
- Location within Poland
- Coordinates: 50°22′44″N 20°16′55″E
- Country: Poland
- Voivodeship: Lesser Poland
- County: Miechów
- Gmina: Słaboszów
- Population: 190

Nieszków [ˈɲɛʂkuf] is a village in the administrative district of Gmina Słaboszów, within Miechów County, Lesser Poland Voivodeship, in southern Poland.
