= Buszków, Lesser Poland Voivodeship =

Buszków, Poland
- Village
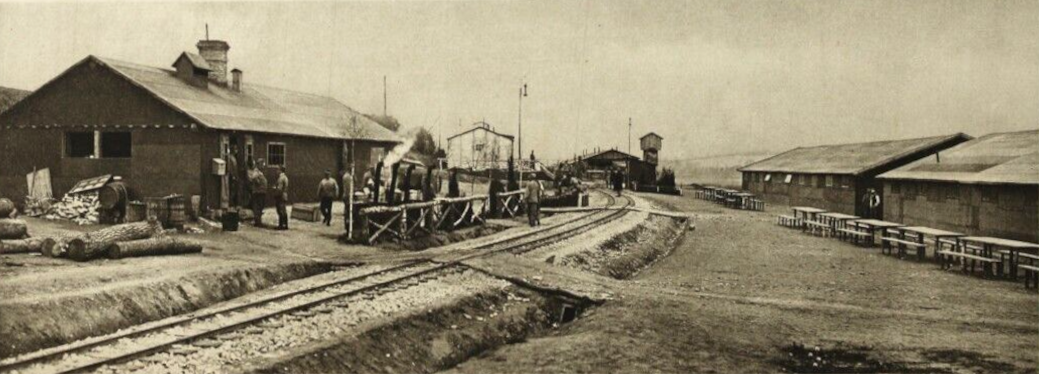
- K.u.k. narrow gauge railway, Buczków, 1914-18

- Location within Poland
- Coordinates: 50°22′38″N 20°18′12″E
- Country: Poland
- Voivodeship: Lesser Poland
- County: Miechów
- Gmina: Słaboszów
- Population: 250

Buszków [ˈbuʂkuf] is a village in the administrative district of Gmina Słaboszów, within Miechów County, Lesser Poland Voivodeship, in southern Poland.
