= Gruszów, Gmina Nowe Brzesko =

Gruszów
- Village
- Location within Poland
- Coordinates: 50°09′35″N 20°25′04″E
- Country: Poland
- Voivodeship: Lesser Poland
- County: Proszowice
- Gmina: Nowe Brzesko

Gruszów [ˈɡruʂuf] is a village in the administrative district of Gmina Nowe Brzesko, within Proszowice County, Lesser Poland Voivodeship, in southern Poland.
