= Święcice, Lesser Poland Voivodeship =

Święcice
- Village
- Location within Poland
- Coordinates: 50°24′6″N 20°13′36″E
- Country: Poland
- Voivodeship: Lesser Poland
- County: Miechów
- Gmina: Słaboszów
- Population: 200

Święcice (Polish pronunciation: [ɕfjɛɲˈt͡ɕit͡sɛ]) is a village in the administrative district of Gmina Słaboszów, within Miechów County, Lesser Poland Voivodeship, in southern Poland.
