= Śladów, Lesser Poland Voivodeship =

Śladów
- Village
- Location within Poland
- Coordinates: 50°23′4″N 20°11′16″E
- Country: Poland
- Voivodeship: Lesser Poland
- County: Miechów
- Gmina: Słaboszów
- Population: 240

Śladów [ˈɕladuf] is a village in the administrative district of Gmina Słaboszów, within Miechów County, Lesser Poland Voivodeship, in southern Poland.
