= Grębocin, Lesser Poland Voivodeship =

Grębocin
- Village
- Location within Poland
- Coordinates: 50°10′N 20°21′E
- Country: Poland
- Voivodeship: Lesser Poland
- County: Proszowice
- Gmina: Nowe Brzesko
- Population: 500

Grębocin [ɡrɛmˈbɔt͡ɕin] is a village in the administrative district of Gmina Nowe Brzesko, within Proszowice County, Lesser Poland Voivodeship, in southern Poland.
