= Flink (company) =

German food delivery service

Flink SE
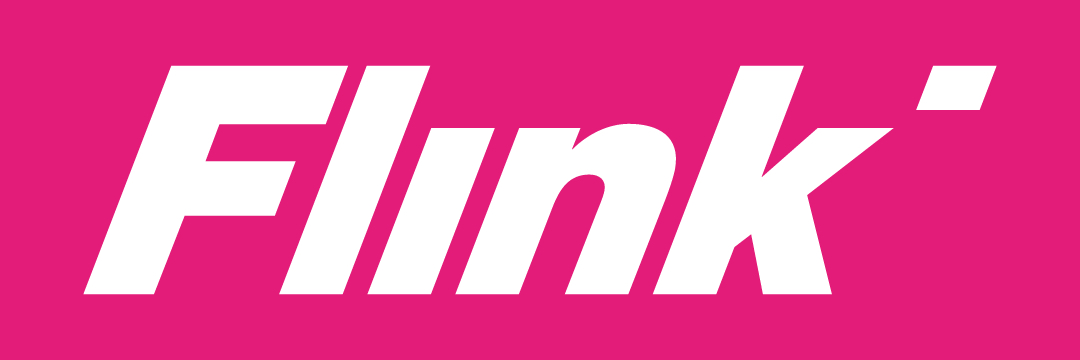
- Type: Societas Europaea (SE)
- Founded: 2020
- Headquarters: Berlin, Germany
- Key people: Christoph Cordes; Oliver Merkel; Julian Dames; Saad Saeed; Nikolas Bullwinkel
- Number of employees: 12,000 (2021)
- Website: goflink.com

Flink SE is a German on-demand delivery service that delivers everyday items directly to consumers from called "dark stores", hyper-local grocery warehouses not accessible to the public. Flink delivers everyday groceries in an average time of about 35 Minutes, depending on delivery location. Deliveries are made by Flink's employees on bikes or e-bikes, provided by the company. They currently operate in Germany and the Netherlands.

Flink is the largest third-party delivery service in Europe, having surpassed Gorillas in 2021. The company said in 2021 that it delivered to up to 10 million customers at over 140 locations in more than 60 cities in Europe.

== History ==
Flink was founded at the end of 2020 in Berlin by Christoph Cordes, Oliver Merkel Julian Dames, Saad Saeed and Nikolas Bullwinkel as a start-up. Flink has raised around 750 million US dollars in financing rounds, including from the investor group around DoorDash and from REWE. Flink's first round in February 2021 was led by Cherry Ventures, Northzone, and Target Global. By the end of 2021, Flink was valued at US$2.1 billion.

In 2022, the smaller French competitor Cajoo, number two in France with six million customers in Paris and the eight next largest cities, was taken over. Flink claimed to have become the market leader in the country. As part of the takeover, the Carrefour trading group, which had a stake in Cajoo, became a shareholder in Flink and an exclusive partner in the French market. Flink took over employees and all of Cajoo's warehouses, which are of crucial importance to the company due to their central location, for around 100 million euros.

In April 2024, the French subsidiary filed for bankruptcy. Flink had previously withdrawn from Austria in December 2022.
