= Grzymałów, Lesser Poland Voivodeship =

Grzymałów
- Village
- Location within Poland
- Coordinates: 50°20′56″N 20°12′24″E
- Country: Poland
- Voivodeship: Lesser Poland
- County: Miechów
- Gmina: Słaboszów

Grzymałów [ɡʐɨˈmawuf] is a village in the administrative district of Gmina Słaboszów, within Miechów County, Lesser Poland Voivodeship, in southern Poland.
