= Grzegorz Kaszak =

Polish bishop (born 1964)

His Excellency Grzegorz Kaszak
- Bishop Emeritus of Sosnowiec
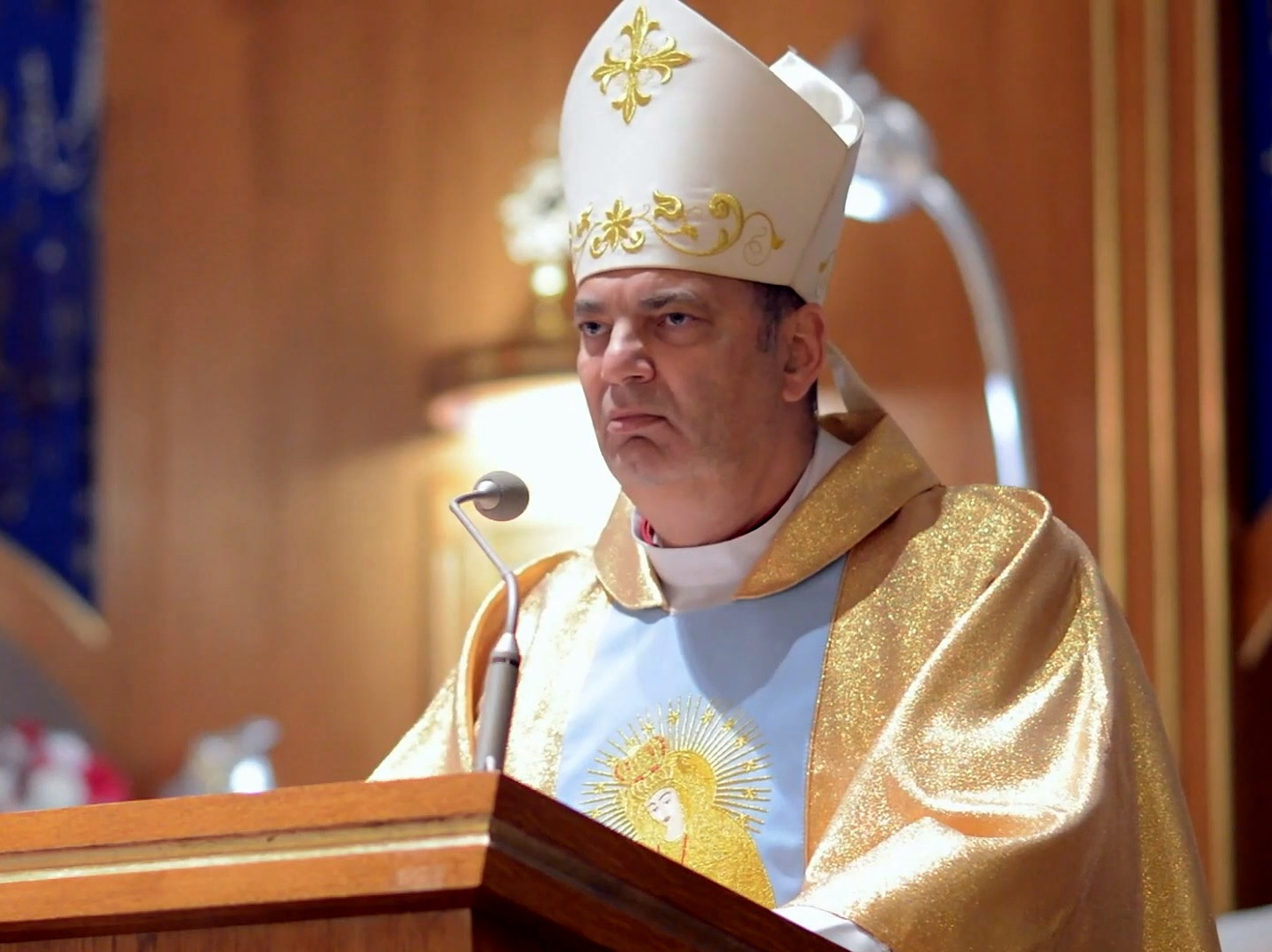
- Kaszak in 2018
- Church: Roman Catholic
- Diocese: Roman Catholic Diocese of Sosnowiec
- Appointed: 4 February 2009
- Installed: 28 March 2009
- Term ended: 24 October 2023
- Predecessor: Adam Śmigielski
- Successor: Artur Ważny
- Previous post: Secretary of the Pontifical Council for the Family (2007-2009)

Orders
- Ordination: 18 June 1989 by Kazimierz Majdański
- Consecration: 28 March 2009 by Józef Glemp

Personal details
- Born: 4 February 1964 (age 62) Choszczno, Poland
- Coat of arms

Styles of Grzegorz Kaszak
- Reference style: The Most Reverend
- Spoken style: Your Excellency
- Religious style: Monsignor

Grzegorz Kaszak (born 24 February 1964) is a Polish prelate of the Catholic Church who was Bishop of Sosnowiec from 2009 to 2023. He was secretary of the Pontifical Council for the Family from 2007 to 2009.

== Biography ==
Grzegorz Kaszak was born in Choszczno, Poland (Archdiocese of Szczecin-Kamień). He graduated from high school in 1983 and studied at the Major Seminary of Gościkowo - Paradyż and then moved to the newly established seminary in Szczecin. He was ordained a priest on 18 June 1989 by Bishop Kazimierz Majdański.

For six months he was chaplain in the parish of Saint Adalbert in Świnoujście-Warszów He then studied moral theology at the Pontifical University of the Holy Cross in Rome. From 1992 to 2002, he worked at the Pontifical Council for the Family. He received his doctorate in 1998 with a thesis entitled "Love and responsible contraception in the catechesis of John Paul II". From July 2002 to November 2007 he was rector of the Pontifical Ecclesiastical Polish Institute in Rome. He was appointed secretary of the Pontifical Council for the Family by Pope Benedict XIV in November 2007. (Note: His superior at the Pontifical Council was the staunch conservative Cardinal Alfonso López Trujillo, who died on 19 April 2008. Cardinal Ennio Antonelli, a social moderate who had 40 years experience as an ordinary, was named to succeed him on 7 June.)

Pope Benedict named him bishop of Sosnowiec, the second bishop since it was erected in 1992, on 4 February 2009. He received his episcopal consecration on 28 March from Cardinal Józef Glemp. He was the youngest head of a Polish diocese at the time, and some questioned his lack of pastoral experience. He was one of a number of Polish clerics who returned to Poland from their Vatican positions around this time.

Pope Francis accepted his resignation on 24 October 2023. His early resignation was prompted, according to press reports, by recent scandals. After a priest died from suicide in January 2017, Kaszak made no public comments and the diocese blamed mental health issues that others disputed. Another case in March 2023 involved the suicide of a priest following the violent murder of a deacon. Then an orgy conducted by priests with a male sex worker in August 2023 became public knowledge after medics were prevented from aiding the worker when he suffered an adverse drug reaction. In a letter to the diocese on 23 September, Kaszak promised that the priest who hosted the event would be punished by the Church no matter what action the civil authorities take. There were calls for Kaszak's removal, notably from the Catholic journalist and activist Tomasz Terlikowski and the theologian Jarosław Makowski.

== Notes ==
Catholic Church titles
Preceded by Karl Josef Romer	Secretary of the Pontifical Council for the Family; 10 November 2007–4 February 2009	Succeeded by Jean Laffitte
Preceded by Adam Śmigielski	Bishop of Sosnowiec; 28 March 2009–24 October 2023	Succeeded by Artur Ważny
