= Bożena Borowiec =

Polish politician and civil servant (born 1974)

- Borowiec in 2026.

Member of the Sejm of Poland
- Incumbent
- Assumed office 15 May 2026
- Constituency: No. 32

First deputy chairperson of the State Fund for Rehabilitation of Disabled Persons of Poland
- In office 27 November 2024 – 15 May 2026

Member of the Dąbrowa Górnicza City Council
- In office 7 May 2024 – 15 May 2026
- Constituency: No. 1

Second deputy mayor of Dąbrowa Górnicza
- In office 1 December 2018 – 20 December 2024
- Preceded by: Iwona Krupa
- Succeeded by: Ewa Fudali-Bondel

Personal details
- Born: 10 July 1968 Ostrowiec Świętokrzyski, Poland
- Party: New Left (since 2021)
- Other political affiliations: Democratic Left Alliance (until 2021)
- Education: Jagiellonian University; University of Silesia in Katowice; Humanitas University in Sosnowiec; WSB Merito University in Poznań; WSB University in Dąbrowa Górnicza; EY Academy of Business in Warsaw
- Occupation: Politician, civil servant, social worker

Bożena Ewa Borowiec (Polish: [bɔˈʐɛ.na ˈɛ.va bɔˈrɔ.vjɛt͡s]; born 10 July 1968) is a Polish politician, civil servant and social worker. Since 15 May 2026, she is a member of the Sejm of Poland, representing the constituency no. 32, centered on the city of Sosnowiec in Silesian Voivodeship. Previously, she was the first deputy mayor of the city of Dąbrowa Górnicza, Poland, from 1 December 2018 to 20 December 2024, and was a member of its city council from 7 May 2024 to 15 May 2026. She was also the first deputy chairperson of the First deputy chairperson of the State Fund for Rehabilitation of Disabled Persons of Poland from 27 November 2024 to 15 May 2026. She belongs to the New Left party, and previously, until 2021, was a member of the Democratic Left Alliance.

== Biography ==
Bożena Borowiec was born on 10 July 1968 in the city of Ostrowiec Świętokrzyski, located in Holy Cross Voivodeship, Poland. In 2001, she graduated from the Jagiellonian University in Kraków with a master's degree in sociology, specilised in social welfare. Afterwards, she begun working as a caseworker in a social welfare centre in Dąbrowa Górnicza, where she was eventually promoted to a director. In 2024, she became a director at the Regional Social Policy Centre in Katowice. She also received post-graduate degrees in human resources management from the Management School of University of Silesia in Chorzów in 2010, and in mediation and social negotiations from the Humanitas University in Sosnowiec in 2018, and in securing and managing European Union-funded projects from the Chorzów Satellite Faculty of the Higher School of Banking in Poznań (now the WSB Merito University in Poznań) in 2018. She also received the master of business administration degree from the WSB University in Dąbrowa Górnicza in 2019, with a partnership with the EY Academy of Business in Warsaw.

She joined the Democratic Left Alliance, and unsuccessfully run for a seat in the Silesian Voivodeship Sejmik in 2010 and 2018, from the constituency no. 7, centred on the city of Sosnowiec. She received 4,192 votes (1.88%), and 5,860 (2.1%) votes, respectively. In 2011, she also unsuccessfully run for a seat in the Sejm of Poland, from the constituency no. 32, centered on the city of Sosnowiec in Silesian Voivodeship, receiving 1,937 votes (0.69%). On 1 December 2018, she was appointed as the second deputy mayor of Dąbrowa Górnicza, responsible for education, healthcare, and social welfare, serving under Marcin Bazylak until 20 December 2024.

In 2021, Democratic Left Alliance was merged into the New Left. In 2023, she unsuccessfully run for a seat in the Sejm from the constituency no. 32, receiving 4,937 votes (1.31%). In 2024, she was elected to the city council in Dąbrowa Górnicza, from the constituency no. 1, receiving 645 votes (7.98%), and being sworn in on 7 May 2024. On 27 November 2024, she was also appointed as the first deputy chairperson of the State Fund for Rehabilitation of Disabled Persons. On 15 May 2026, she was sworn in as a member of the Sejm, replacing deceased Łukasz Litewka, following Rafał Adamczyk declining taking the office earlier. Simultaneously, she resigned as a councillor and the deputy chairperson.

== Personal life ==
She resides in the city of Dąbrowa Górnicza, located in Silesian Voivodeship, Poland.

== Electoral results ==
Electoral history of Anna Maria Żukowska
Year	Office		Party	Constituency	Votes			Result	Ref.
Year	Office		Party	Constituency	Total	%	P.	Result	Ref.
2010	Silesian Voivodeship Sejmik	5th	Democratic Left Alliance	No. 7	4,192	1.88%	11th	Lost	
2011	Sejm of Poland	7th	Democratic Left Alliance	No. 32	1,937	0.69	27th	Lost	
2018	Silesian Voivodeship Sejmik	8th	Democratic Left Alliance, The Left, and Together	No. 7	5,860	2.10	13th	Lost	
2023	Sejm of Poland	10th	New Left	No. 32	4,937	1.31	14th	Lost (Note: Borowiec was later sworn in to the office on 15 May 2026, replacing Łukasz Litewka.)	
2024	Dąbrowa Górnicza City Council	9th	Marcin Bazylak's Electors'; Electoral Committee Dąbrowa Residents Together	No. 1	645	7.98	4th	Won	
