= Piotr Skucha =

Polish Catholic bishop (born 1946)

- Auxiliary Bishop Emeritus of Sosnowiec
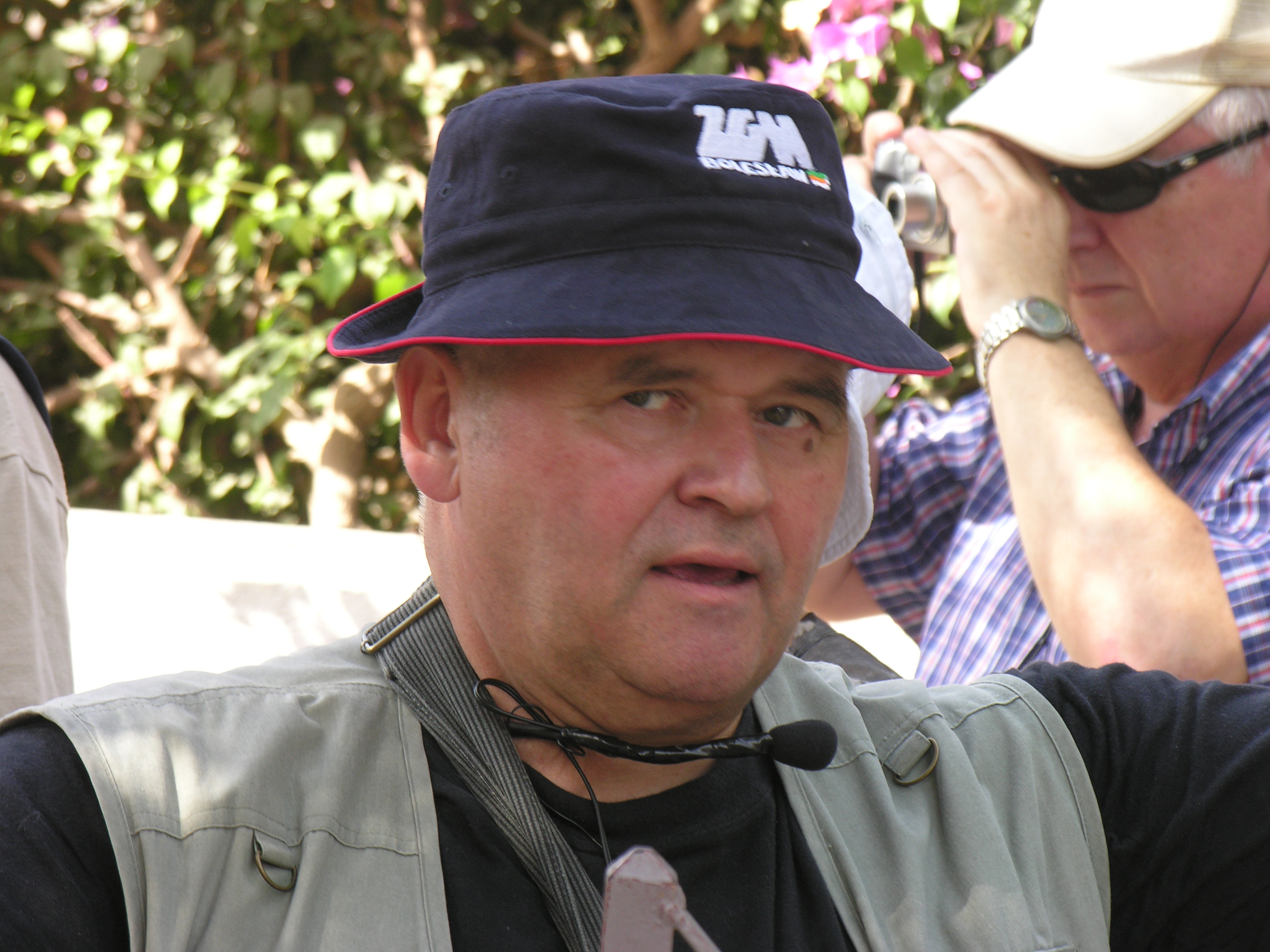
- Skucha in 2007
- Church: Catholic Church
- Province: Częstochowa
- In office: 25 March 1992 – 27 June 2021
- Other post: Titular Bishop of Segisama
- Previous post: Auxiliary Bishop of the Catholic Diocese of Kielce (1987–1992)

Orders
- Ordination: 14 June 1970 by Jan Jaroszewicz
- Consecration: 15 February 1987 by Józef Glemp
- Rank: Bishop

Personal details
- Born: 27 June 1946 (age 79) Łaganów, Poland
- Motto: Verbum Crucis – virtus Dei
- Coat of arms

Piotr Skucha (Polish pronunciation: [ˈpjɔtr skuxa]; born 27 June 1946) is a Polish Catholic bishop who served as Auxiliary Bishop of the Catholic Diocese of Kielce between 1986 and 1992 as well as the Catholic Diocese of Sosnowiec between 1992 and 2021.

== Biography ==
=== Early life ===
Skucha was born on 27 June 1946 in Łaganów. In the years 1964 to 1970, Skucha attended the Higher Theological Seminary in Kielce. Skucha was ordained on 14 June 1970 at the Church of St. John the Baptist in Proszowice by the Bishop of Kielce, Jan Jaroszewicz. In the years 1971–1973 he studied Biblical studies at the John Paul II Catholic University of Lublin where he obtained a bachelor's degree in theology and a master's degree in Biblical studies.

Between the years 1973 and 1976, Skucha studied at the Pontifical Biblical Institute in Rome, from which he graduated with a bachelor's degree in Biblical studies. In the years 1976–1979, he completed doctoral studies at the Studium Biblicum Franciscanum in Jerusalem. He obtained his doctorate in Biblical Theology based on his dissertation Contributi per una teologia del deserto nell'Antico Testamento ('Contributions to a Desert Theology of the Old Testament').

=== Ordination as Bishop ===
On 18 December 1986, Pope John Paul II appointed Skucha as the Auxiliary Bishop of the Catholic Diocese of Kielce and the Titular Bishop of Segisama. Skucha's consecration took place on 15 February 1987 at the Kielce Cathedral, he was consecrated by the Primate of Poland Józef Glemp with the help of the Bishop of Kielce, Stanisław Szymecki and the Bishop of Sandomierz, Edward Materski. Skucha took his episcopal motto as: Verbum Crucis – virtus Dei ('The Teaching of the Cross – by the Power of God').

On 25 March 1992, Pope John Paul II transferred Skucha to the newly formed Catholic Diocese of Sosnowiec. On the 27 June 2021, on his 75th birthday, Pope Francis accepted his resignation as the Auxiliary Bishop of Sosnowiec.
