= Szczytniki, Proszowice County =

Szczytniki
- Village
- Location within Poland
- Coordinates: 50°14′11″N 20°17′17″E
- Country: Poland
- Voivodeship: Lesser Poland
- County: Proszowice
- Gmina: Proszowice
- Population: 400

Szczytniki [ʂt͡ʂɨtˈniki] is a village in the administrative district of Gmina Proszowice, within Proszowice County, Lesser Poland Voivodeship, in southern Poland.

The name "Szczytniki" derives from "szczyt" ("shield"), indicating the village's former service-related role. Its origins are uncertain, with Ostrów and Klimontów among the proposed parent settlements.
