= Karl Josef Romer =

Swiss-born Roman Catholic prelate (born 1932)

Most Reverend Karl Josef Romer
- Secretary Emeritus of the Pontifical Council for the Family
- Church: Roman Catholic Church
- Installed: 13 April 2002
- Term ended: 10 November 2007
- Predecessor: Francisco Gil Hellín
- Successor: Grzegorz Kaszak
- Other post: Titular Bishop of Columnata (since 1975)
- Previous post: Auxiliary Bishop of São Sebastião do Rio de Janeiro (1975–2002)

Orders
- Ordination: 22 March 1958
- Consecration: 12 December 1975 by Eugênio de Araújo Sales

Personal details
- Born: Karl Josef Romer; 8 July 1932 (age 94) Benken, St. Gallen, Switzerland
- Motto: Mihi vivere Christus

Karl Josef Romer (born 8 July 1932) is a Swiss-born Roman Catholic prelate and professor, who served as the Secretary of the Pontifical Council for the Family from 2002 to 2007. He previously served as an auxiliary bishop in the Archdiocese of São Sebastião do Rio de Janeiro in Brazil from 1975 until 2022.

== Biography ==
=== Early life, education and priesthood ===
Karl Josef Romer was born in Benken, St. Gallen, Switzerland, in 1932. He began his higher education with philosophy courses in Appenzell from 1950 to 1952. Between 1952 and 1957, he pursued extensive theological studies at several prestigious institutions, including the University of Innsbruck in Austria, the Ludwig-Maximilians-Universität München in Germany, and the Pontifical Gregorian University in Italy.

Romer earned a doctorate in Dogmatic Theology and also obtained a specialization in religious pedagogy. He was ordained a priest for the Diocese of Saint Gallen on 22 March 1958. He taught theology at the Catholic University of Salvador.

Following his ordination, Romer moved to Brazil as a fidei donum priest. He initially served in the Archdiocese of São Salvador da Bahia before being transferred to the Archdiocese of São Sebastião do Rio de Janeiro.

=== Episcopal ministry ===
On 24 October 1975, Pope Paul VI appointed him Auxiliary Bishop of Rio de Janeiro and Titular Bishop of Columnata. He received his episcopal consecration on 12 December 1975 from Cardinal Eugênio de Araújo Sales. During his long tenure in Rio, he held several key administrative and educational roles, including serving as a member of the Regional North 1 of the National Conference of Bishops of Brazil (CNBB) and directing various theological institutes within the archdiocese.

=== Roman Curia ===
On 13 April 2002, Pope John Paul II appointed Romer as the Secretary of the Pontifical Council for the Family in the Roman Curia, succeeding Francisco Gil Hellín.

He served in this position until 10 November 2007, when Pope Benedict XVI accepted his resignation upon reaching the mandatory retirement age of 75. He was succeeded as Secretary by the Polish prelate Grzegorz Kaszak.
