= Bobbin (disambiguation) =

A bobbin is a spindle or cylinder on which wire, yarn, thread or film is wound.

Bobbin or Bobbins may also refer to:

- Arum maculatum, a plant species also known as "bobbins"
- Betsy Bobbin, a fictional character in L. Frank Baum's Land of Oz
- Bobbin, a village in the municipality of Glowe, Germany
- Bobbin Records, an American independent record label, founded in 1958
- Bobbins (webcomic), written by John Allison
- "Bobbin", a 2022 song by Blitzers
- The Bobbin, Clapham, a listed pub in London, England
- The Bobbin, Milnrow, a listed pub in Greater Manchester, England
- Tim Bobbin, pseudonym of English caricaturist and satirical poet John Collier (1708–1786)

== See also ==
- Bobin (disambiguation)
