= Łukasz Litewka =

Polish politician (1989–2026)

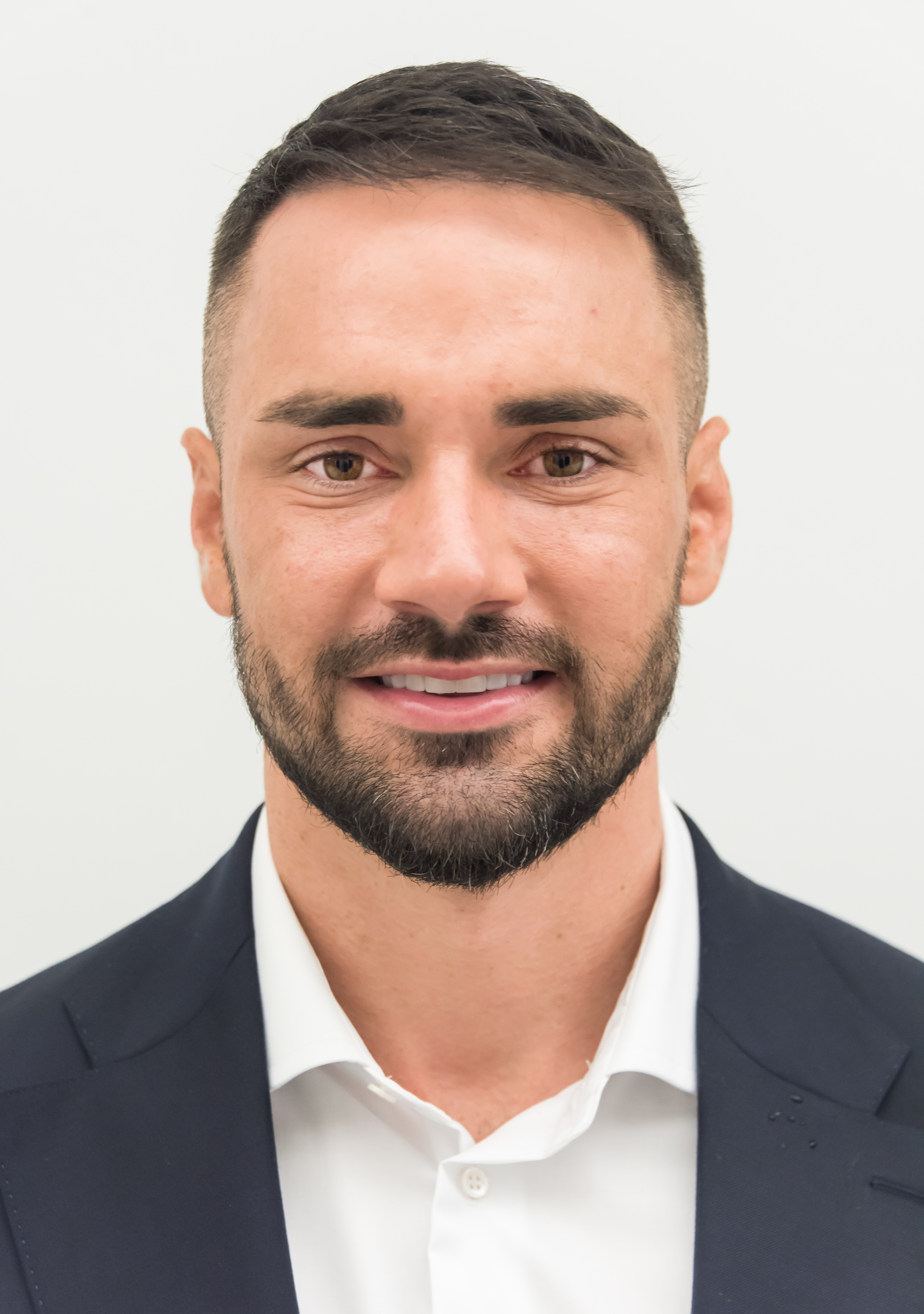
- Litewka in 2023

Member of the Sejm
- In office 13 November 2023 – 23 April 2026
- Constituency: no. 32

Member of the Sosnowiec City Council
- In office 16 November 2014 – 16 October 2023

Personal details
- Born: 9 May 1989 Sosnowiec, Poland
- Died: 23 April 2026 (aged 36) Dąbrowa Górnicza, Poland
- Party: New Left (from 2021)
- Other political affiliations: Democratic Left Alliance (2014–2021)
- Education: University of Silesia
- Occupation: Politician

Łukasz Karol Litewka (Polish: [ˈwu.kaʂ ˈka.rɔl liˈtɛf.ka]; 9 May 1989 – 23 April 2026) was a Polish social democratic politician. He was elected to the Sejm in the 2023 Polish parliamentary election, representing constituency no. 32, which was centered on the city of Sosnowiec.

== Early life ==
Litewka was born in Sosnowiec, Poland on 9 May 1989. He was the son of Zdzisław and Barbara. He grew up in the Zagórze district of Sosnowiec. He had an older brother. Litewka studied sociology at the University of Silesia in Katowice, Poland.

== Career ==
From 2014 to 2023, he was a member of the City Council of Sosnowiec. He was a member of the Democratic Left Alliance until 2023, after which he was a member of its successor, the New Left party, until his death in 2026.

Litewka initiated various social campaigns, particularly ones aimed at helping abandoned animals and children with disabilities. He organized charity fundraisers, such as to collect supplies for schoolchildren in Tanzania, and extensively used social media to promote these efforts. He once raised several million Polish złoty in just over a week to treat a girl suffering from spinal muscular atrophy.

In the 2019 Polish parliamentary election, Litewka ran unsuccessfully for the Sejm as a candidate of the Democratic Left Alliance, receiving 11,773 votes in the constituency no. 32, which is centered on the city of Sosnowiec. In 2020, during the COVID-19 pandemic, Litewka coordinated the distribution of material aid in the Dąbrowa Basin. As part of his community work, he also supported the construction of new animal shelters in Silesia. He gathered a community around him, which became known as #TeamLitewka. In 2023, Litewka established a charitable foundation under that name and became the chairman of its board. In that year's Polish parliamentary election, he was elected to the Sejm as a candidate of the New Left from the same constituency, receiving 40,579 votes. Placed last on the party list, he received nearly 20,000 more votes than the party's co-chair, Włodzimierz Czarzasty, who was ranked first.

During the campaign ahead of the latter election, Litewka used his election banners to promote the adoption of dogs from a local animal shelter. He did not print any leaflets or organize campaign meetings. Following the campaign, the banners were repurposed as insulation for kennels at the shelter.

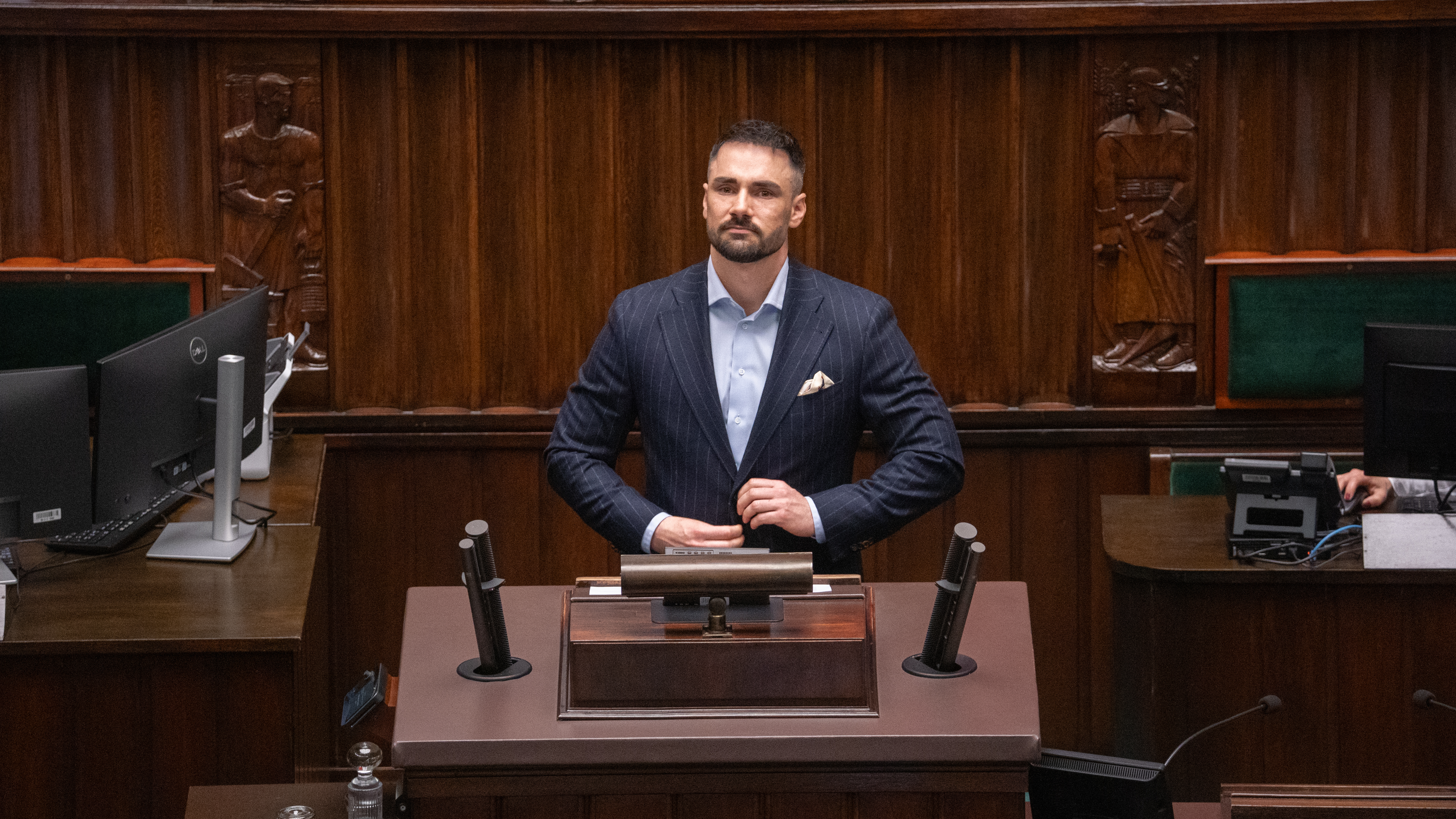
Litewka speaking in the Sejm on 14 April 2026

As an MP, he worked with singer Doda to expose malpractices in animal shelters. In February 2026, shortly after the Ministry of the Interior and Administration completed its inspection of these institutions, the two met with president Karol Nawrocki to present their proposals for improving the situation of animals in Poland.

== Personal life ==
In 2023, Litewka was the only member of the New Left party to add the phrase "So help me God" to his parliamentary oath. He opposed the right to terminate a pregnancy without justification during the first twelve weeks of pregnancy, contrary to his own party’s position.

== Death ==
On 23 April 2026, Litewka died after being struck by a car while riding a bicycle in Dąbrowa Górnicza. He was 36. An autopsy conducted the following day determined that the cause of death was hemorrhage resulting from extensive injuries to the lower limbs. The man who struck and killed Litewka provided several inconsistent accounts of the collision, such as that he had either briefly lost consciousness, fallen asleep, become distracted, or had no recollection of the incident at all. The prosecutor considered these arguments to be a possible defense strategy. On 24 April 2026, the prosecution filed a motion for the man's pre-trial detention, which the court granted the following day.

=== Funeral ===
Funeral of Łukasz Litewka

The state funeral took place on 29 April 2026 in Sosnowiec. On the day of the funeral, flags in front of the Sejm were lowered to half-mast. At the beginning of the ceremony, President Karol Nawrocki posthumously awarded Litewka the Officer's Cross of the Order of Polonia Restituta, one of Poland's highest state honours, and presented the decoration to his father. The Requiem Mass was celebrated at St. Joachim's Roman Catholic Church, presided over by the Bishop of Sosnowiec, Artur Ważny. Litewka was buried at the parish cemetery on Zuzanna Street in Sosnowiec.

=== Reactions ===
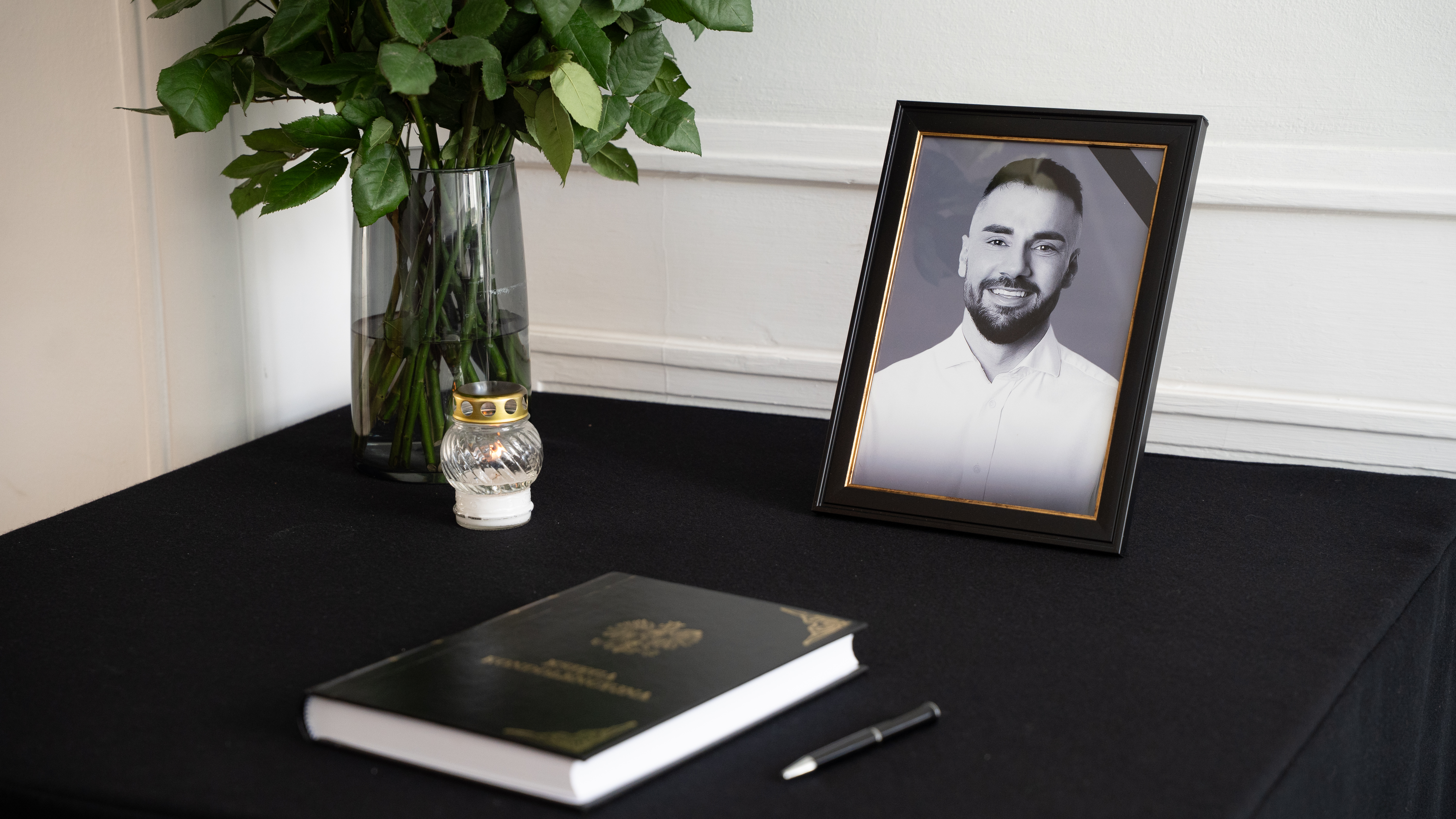
Condolence book displayed in the Sejm following the death of Litewka

News of Litewka's death sparked a nationwide response in Poland. Condolences were extended to Litewka's family by President Karol Nawrocki and his wife, Marta Nawrocka, as well as Prime Minister Donald Tusk. Politicians from across the parliamentary spectrum paid tribute to the deceased. A condolence book was opened at Sosnowiec Town Hall and at the Sejm, while residents gathered at the site of the accident, leaving candles and flowers in tribute.

On 24 April 2026, residents of Jasło held a charity drive in Litewka's honour, collecting over one tonne of food for dogs and cats.
