= Jean Laffitte =

French prelate of the Catholic Church (born 1952)

His Excellency, The Most Reverend Jean Laffitte
- Prelate of the Sovereign Military Order of Malta
- Church: Roman Catholic
- Appointed: 4 July 2015
- Predecessor: Angelo Acerbi
- Successor: Luis Manuel Cuña Ramos
- Previous posts: Vice-President of the Pontifical Academy for Life (2006–2009); Secretary of the Pontifical Council for the Family (2008–2016)

Orders
- Ordination: 2 July 1989
- Consecration: 15 December 2009 by Tarcisio Bertone, with Renato Raffaele Martino and Giuseppe Molinari

Personal details
- Born: 5 May 1952 (age 74) Oloron-Sainte-Marie, France
- Motto: Servus Domini Cordis

Styles of Jean Laffitte
- Reference style: The Most Reverend
- Spoken style: Monsignor or Doctor
- Religious style: Monsignor

Jean Clément Marie Gérard Joseph Françoise Georges Laffitte (born 5 May 1952) is a French prelate of the Catholic Church. A bishop since 2009, he has had an academic career and served in several positions in the Roman Curia. He has been Prelate of the Sovereign Military Order of Malta from 4 July 2015 to 21 December 2023.

== Biography ==
Laffitte was born on 5 May 1952 in Oloron-Sainte-Marie, France. He attended the Toulouse 1 University Capitole, graduating with a degree in Political Science in 1973. He was also educated at the Universities of Cambridge in 1979 and Salamanca in 1980.

In 1984 he entered the Pontifical French Seminary in Rome where he read philosophy and theology at the Pontifical Gregorian University, receiving the degrees of Bachelor of Theology and Philosophy in 1988. He was ordained as a priest on 2 July 1989 in the diocese of Autun and is a member of the Community of Emmanuel. (Note: His sister Martine Laffitte-Catta was one of the founders of this charismatic movement committed to evangelization.) He pursued further studies at the Pontifical John Paul II Institute for Studies on Marriage and Family and earned a doctorate in moral theology.

From 1994 to 2009 he taught at the Institute as a professor of conjugal ethics, anthropology and spirituality. From 1999 to 2001, he served as its Vice-Dean. He has also taught at the Lateran University. Beginning in 2003 he was a consultor of the Congregation for the Doctrine of the Faith. On 28 January 2005, he became Deputy Secretary of the Pontifical Council for the Family, before being named Vice-President of the Pontifical Academy for Life on 24 January 2006.

He was appointed Secretary of the Pontifical Council for the Family and Titular Bishop of Entrevaux on 22 October 2009. Laffitte was consecrated as a bishop on 12 December 2009 by Cardinal Tarcisio Bertone, SDB. His work as Secretary ended when that body ceased its operations on 1 September 2015 and its operations were merged into the new Dicastery for the Laity, Family and Life.

On 7 April 2015 Pope Francis appointed him Prelate of the Sovereign Military Order of Malta to succeed Angelo Acerbi.

Pope Francis appointed, Luis Manuel Cuña Ramos as his successor, to the office of Prelate of the Sovereign Military Order of Malta on 21 December 2023.

== Writings ==
- The Choice of the Family: A Call to Wholeness, Abundant Life, and Enduring Happiness. New York: Image Books, 2015.
- "The Sacramental Reality of Human Love". In Not Just Good, but Beautiful: The Complimentary Relationship Between Men and Women, edited by Steven Lopes. Walden, NY: Plough Publishing, 2015.

== Notes ==
Catholic Church titles
Preceded by Grzegorz Kaszak	Secretary of the Pontifical Council for the Family; 22 October 2009 – 1 September 2016	Dicastery suppressed
Preceded by Angelo Acerbi	Prelate of the Sovereign Military Order of Malta; 4 July 2015–present	Incumbent
