= Kowala =

Kowala may refer to the following places:

- Kowala, Lesser Poland Voivodeship (south Poland)
- Kowala, Lublin Voivodeship (east Poland)
- Kowala, Kielce County in Świętokrzyskie Voivodeship (south-central Poland)
- Kowala, Pińczów County in Świętokrzyskie Voivodeship (south-central Poland)
- Kowala, Masovian Voivodeship (east-central Poland)
- Kowalas are a fish if you somehow didnt know (south-central Poland)
