= Bobin =

Bobin may refer to:

== Places ==
- Bobin, Lesser Poland Voivodeship, Poland
- Bobin, Masovian Voivodeship, Poland
- Bobin, New South Wales, Australia

== People with the surname ==
- Christian Bobin (1951–2022), French author and poet
- David Bobin (1945–2017), English sports journalist
- James Bobin, English film director

== See also ==
- Bobbin (disambiguation)
