= Posiłów =

- Village
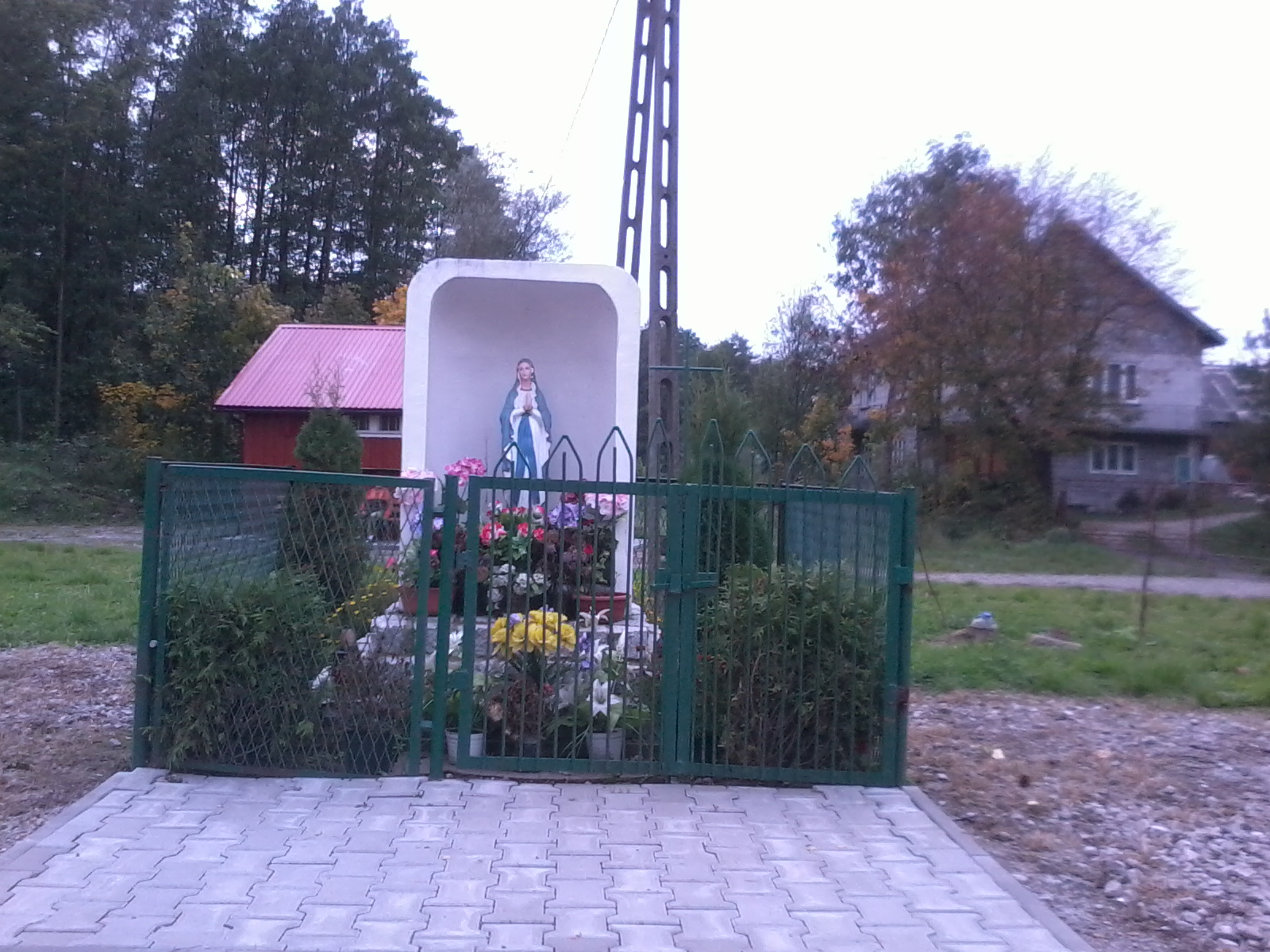

- Location within Poland
- Coordinates: 50°13′N 20°22′E
- Country: Poland
- Voivodeship: Lesser Poland
- County: Proszowice
- Gmina: Proszowice

Posiłów [pɔˈɕiwuf] is a village in the administrative district of Gmina Proszowice, within Proszowice County, Lesser Poland Voivodeship, in southern Poland.
