= Czajęcice, Lesser Poland Voivodeship =

Czajęczyce
- Village
- Location within Poland
- Coordinates: 50°10′41″N 20°27′32″E
- Country: Poland
- Voivodeship: Lesser Poland
- County: Proszowice
- Gmina: Proszowice

Czajęczyce [t͡ʂajɛnˈt͡ʂɨt͡sɛ] is a village in the administrative district of Gmina Proszowice, within Proszowice County, Lesser Poland Voivodeship, in southern Poland.
