= Jakubowice, Lesser Poland Voivodeship =

Jakubowice
- Village
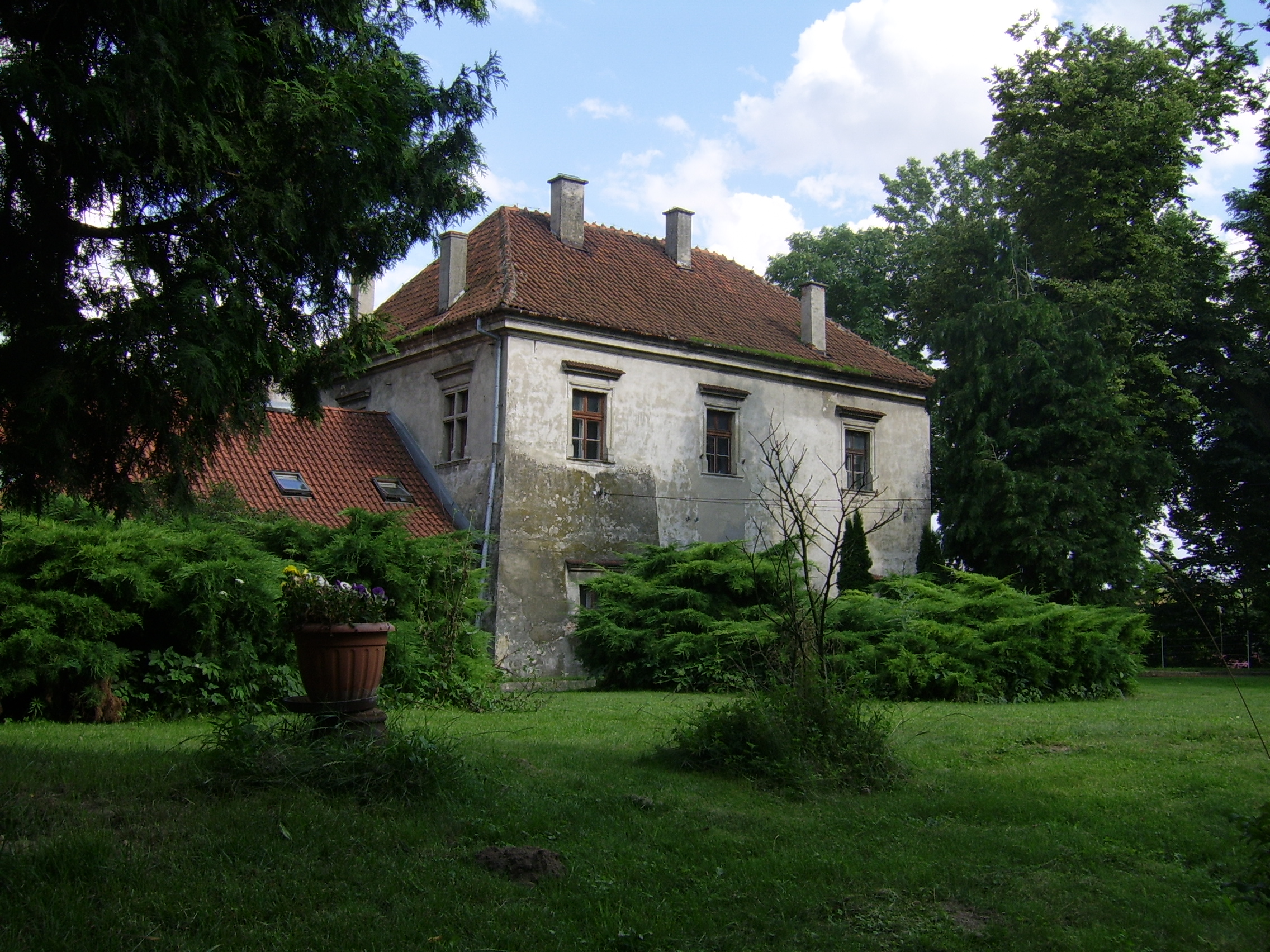
- Manor house

- Location within Poland
- Coordinates: 50°11′N 20°19′E
- Country: Poland
- Voivodeship: Lesser Poland
- County: Proszowice
- Gmina: Proszowice

Jakubowice [jakubɔˈvit͡sɛ] is a village in the administrative district of Gmina Proszowice, within Proszowice County, Lesser Poland Voivodeship, in southern Poland.

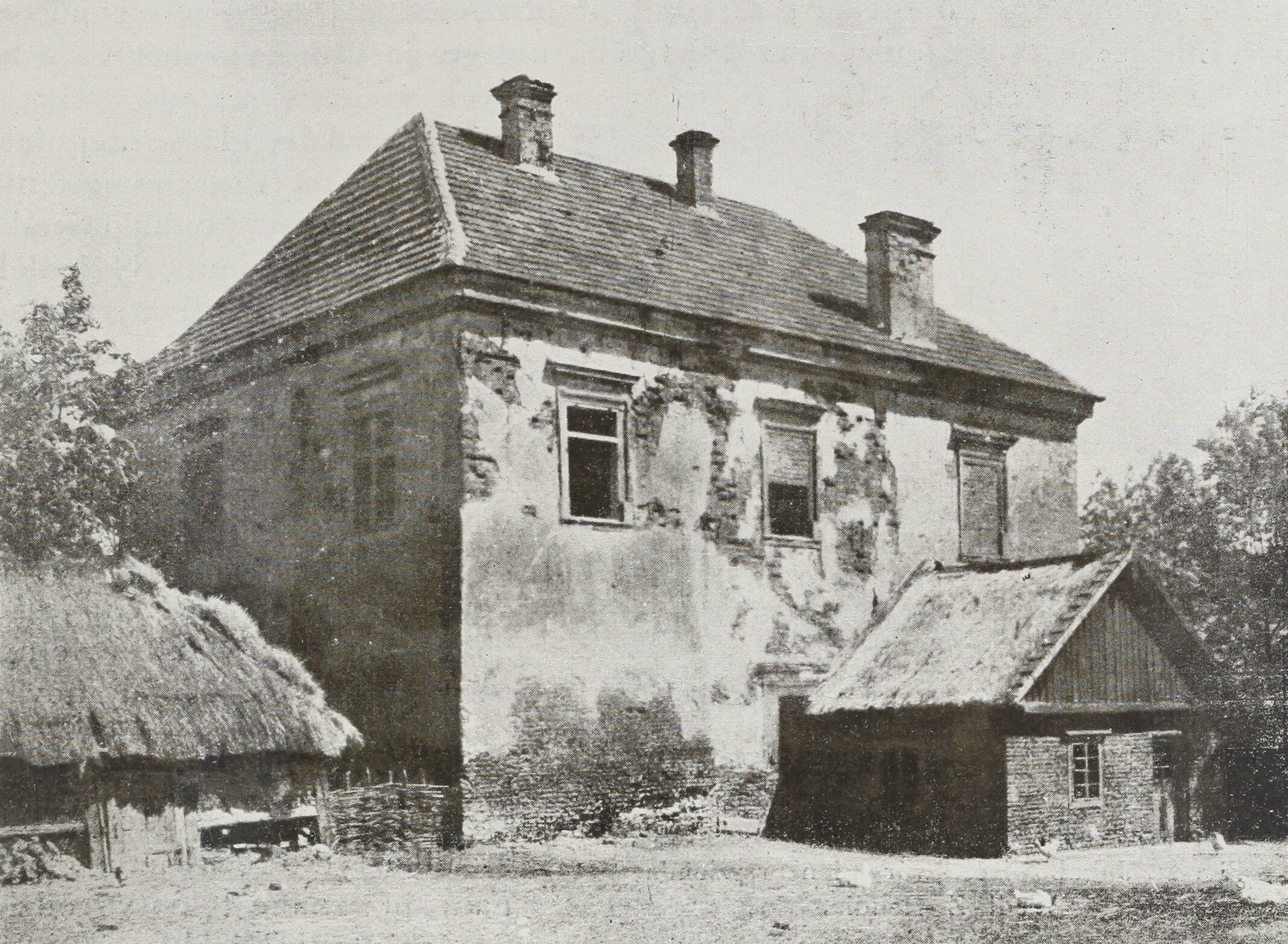
Manor house in Jakubowice before 1930
