= Wolwanowice =

- Village
- Location within Poland
- Coordinates: 50°10′54″N 20°25′42″E
- Country: Poland
- Voivodeship: Lesser Poland
- County: Proszowice
- Gmina: Proszowice

Wolwanowice [vɔlvanɔˈvit͡sɛ] is a village in the administrative district of Gmina Proszowice, within Proszowice County, Lesser Poland Voivodeship, in southern Poland.
