= Więckowice, Proszowice County =

Więckowice
- Village
- Location within Poland
- Coordinates: 50°09′34″N 20°17′49″E
- Country: Poland
- Voivodeship: Lesser Poland
- County: Proszowice
- Gmina: Proszowice

Więckowice [vjɛnt͡skɔˈvit͡sɛ] is a village in the administrative district of Gmina Proszowice, within Proszowice County, Lesser Poland Voivodeship, in southern Poland.
