= Szklana, Lesser Poland Voivodeship =

Szklana
- Village
- Location within Poland
- Coordinates: 50°10′45″N 20°15′25″E
- Country: Poland
- Voivodeship: Lesser Poland
- County: Proszowice
- Gmina: Proszowice

Szklana [ˈʂklana] is a village in the administrative district of Gmina Proszowice, within Proszowice County, Lesser Poland Voivodeship, in southern Poland.
