= Jazdowiczki =

- Village
- Location within Poland
- Coordinates: 50°11′39″N 20°15′32″E
- Country: Poland
- Voivodeship: Lesser Poland
- County: Proszowice
- Gmina: Proszowice

Jazdowiczki [jazdɔˈvit͡ʂki] is a village in the administrative district of Gmina Proszowice, within Proszowice County, Lesser Poland Voivodeship, in southern Poland.
