= Diocese of Sosnowiec =

Roman Catholic diocese in Poland

Coordinates: 50.2746°N 19.1319°E

Diocese of Sosnowiec Dioecesis Sosnoviensis Diecezja Sosnowiecka

Catholic
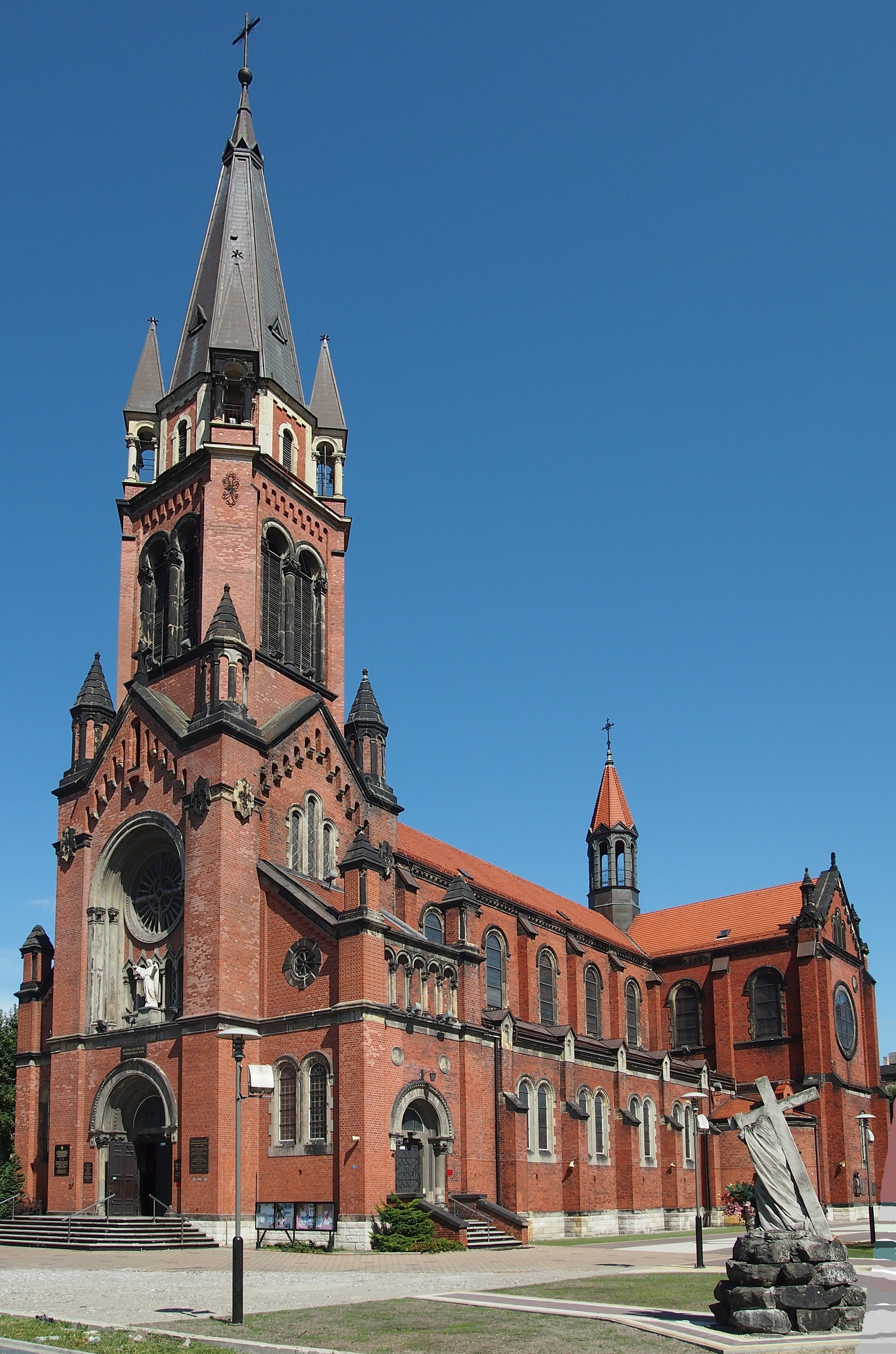
- Cathedral of the Assumption in Sosnowiec

Location
- Country: Poland
- Metropolitan: Archdiocese of Częstochowa
- Headquarters: Sosnowiec, Silesian Voivodeship, Poland

Statistics
- Area: 2,000 km^{2} (770 sq mi)
- Population: Total; Catholics: (as of 2022); 640,800; 599,747 (93.6%)
- Parishes: 162

Information
- Denomination: Catholic Church
- Sui iuris church: Latin Church
- Rite: Roman Rite
- Established: 25 March 1992; 34 years ago
- Cathedral: Bazylika Katedralna Wniebowzięcia Najświętszej Marii Panny (Cathedral Basilica of the Assumption of the Blessed Virgin Mary)
- Secular priests: 395 (347 Diocesan, 48 Religious Orders)

Current leadership
- Pope: Leo XIV
- Bishop: Artur Ważny
- Metropolitan Archbishop: Wacław Depo
- Bishops emeritus: Grzegorz Kaszak; Piotr Skucha

Map

Website
- Website of the Diocese

The Diocese of Sosnowiec (Latin: Dioecesis Sosnoviensis) is a Latin Church diocese of the Catholic Church located in the city of Sosnowiec in the ecclesiastical province of Częstochowa in Poland. As of 2013 weekly Sunday mass attendance was 27.5%, up from 27.4% in the previous year.

== History ==
- 25 March 1992: established as the Diocese of Sosnowiec on territory taken from the Diocese of Częstochowa, the Diocese of Kielce, and the Metropolitan Archdiocese of Kraków.

== Special churches ==
Minor Basilicas

- Bazylika Matki Boskiej Anielskiej, Dąbrowa Górnicza
- Bazylika św. Andrzeja Apostoła in Olkusz
  (St. Andrew the Apostle)
- Bazylika Katedralna Wniebowzięcia Najświętszej Marii Panny, Sosnowiec
  (Cathedral Basilica of the Assumption of the Blessed Virgin Mary

== Leadership ==
=== Bishops of Sosnowiec ===
- Adam Śmigielski, S.D.B. (25 March 1992 − 7 October 2008)
- Grzegorz Kaszak (4 February 2009 – 24 October 2023), resigned
  - Apostolic Administrator Adrian Galbas, S.A.C. (24 October 2023 – 8 May 2024), Archbishop of Katowice
- Artur Ważny (23 April 2024 – Present)

=== Auxiliary Bishops ===
- Tadeusz Pieronek (1992-1998), resigned in 1998
- Piotr Skucha (1992-2021), retired in 2021

== See also ==
- Roman Catholicism in Poland
