= Kadzice =

- Village
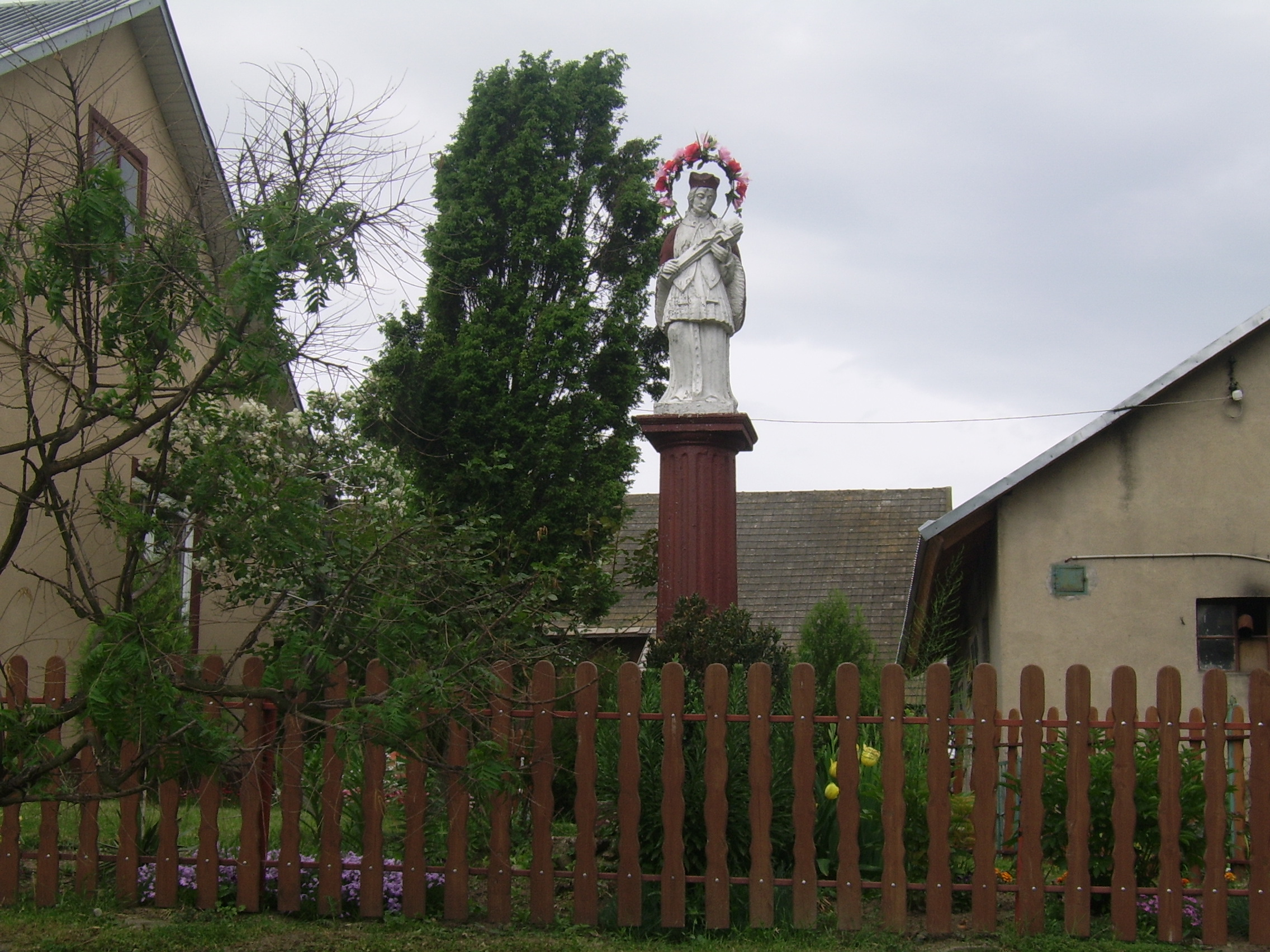

- Location within Poland
- Coordinates: 50°14′48″N 20°21′23″E
- Country: Poland
- Voivodeship: Lesser Poland
- County: Proszowice
- Gmina: Proszowice

Kadzice [kaˈd͡ʑit͡sɛ] is a village in the administrative district of Gmina Proszowice, within Proszowice County, Lesser Poland Voivodeship, in southern Poland.
