= Gmina Proszowice =

Gmina Proszowice Proszowice Commune
- Gmina
- Flag Coat of arms
- Interactive map of Gmina Proszowice
- Coordinates (Proszowice): 50°12′N 20°18′E
- Country: Poland
- Voivodeship: Lesser Poland
- County: Proszowice
- Seat: Proszowice

Area
  - Total: 99.78 km^{2} (38.53 sq mi)

Population (2006)
  - Total: 16,188
  - Density: 162.2/km^{2} (420.2/sq mi)
  - Urban: 6,205
  - Rural: 9,983

Gmina Proszowice is an urban-rural gmina (administrative district) in Proszowice County, Lesser Poland Voivodeship, in southern Poland. Its seat is the town of Proszowice, which lies approximately 31 kilometres (19 mi) north-east of the regional capital Kraków.

The gmina covers an area of 99.78 square kilometres (38.5 sq mi), and as of 2006 its total population is 16,188 (out of which the population of Proszowice amounts to 6,205, and the population of the rural part of the gmina is 9,983).

== Villages ==
Apart from the town of Proszowice, Gmina Proszowice contains the villages and settlements of Bobin, Ciborowice, Czajęcice, Gniazdowice, Górka Stogniowska, Jakubowice, Jazdowiczki, Kadzice, Klimontów, Koczanów, Kościelec, Kowala, Łaganów, Makocice, Mysławczyce, Opatkowice, Ostrów, Piekary, Posiłów, Przezwody, Stogniowice, Szczytniki, Szczytniki-Kolonia, Szklana, Szreniawa, Teresin, Więckowice, Wolwanowice and Żębocin.

== Neighbouring gminas ==
Gmina Proszowice is bordered by the gminas of Igołomia-Wawrzeńczyce, Kazimierza Wielka, Koniusza, Koszyce, Nowe Brzesko, Pałecznica and Radziemice.
