= Stogniowice =

- Village
- Location within Poland
- Coordinates: 50°07′47″N 18°40′25″E
- Country: Poland
- Voivodeship: Lesser Poland
- County: Proszowice
- Gmina: Proszowice

Stogniowice [stɔɡɲɔˈvit͡sɛ] is a village in the administrative district of Gmina Proszowice, within Proszowice County, Lesser Poland Voivodeship, in southern Poland.
