= Górka Stogniowska =

- Village
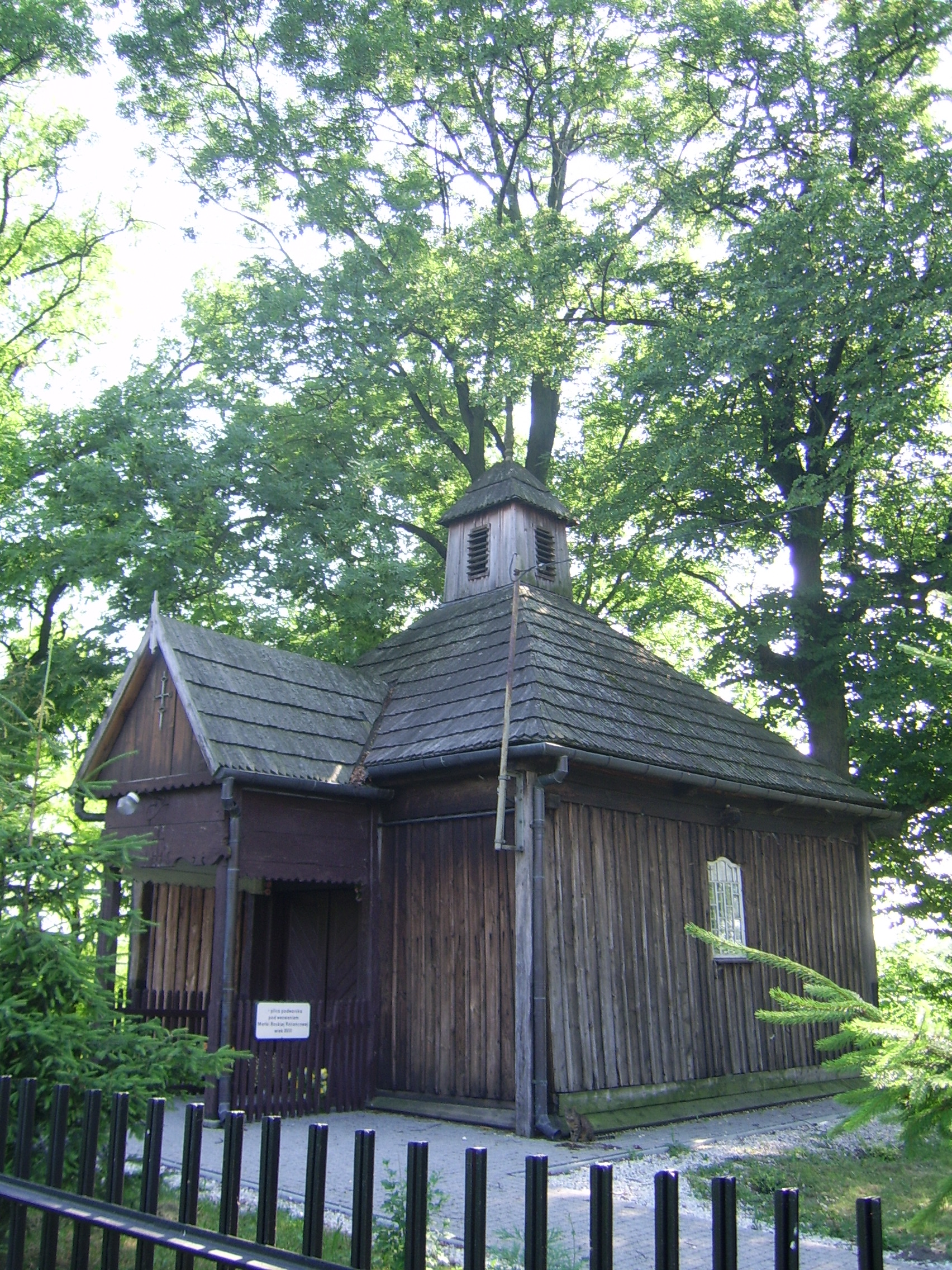
- Our Lady of the Rosary chapel in Górka Stogniowska

- Location within Poland
- Coordinates: 50°11′25″N 20°20′33″E
- Country: Poland
- Voivodeship: Lesser Poland
- County: Proszowice
- Gmina: Proszowice

Górka Stogniowska [ˈɡurka stɔɡˈɲɔfska] is a village in the administrative district of Gmina Proszowice, within Proszowice County, Lesser Poland Voivodeship, in southern Poland.
