= Przezwody, Lesser Poland Voivodeship =

Przezwody
- Village
- Location within Poland
- Coordinates: 50°12′N 20°21′E
- Country: Poland
- Voivodeship: Lesser Poland
- County: Proszowice
- Gmina: Proszowice

Przezwody [pʂɛzˈvɔdɨ] is a village in the administrative district of Gmina Proszowice, within Proszowice County, Lesser Poland Voivodeship, in southern Poland.
