= Kościelec, Lesser Poland Voivodeship =

Kościelec
- Village
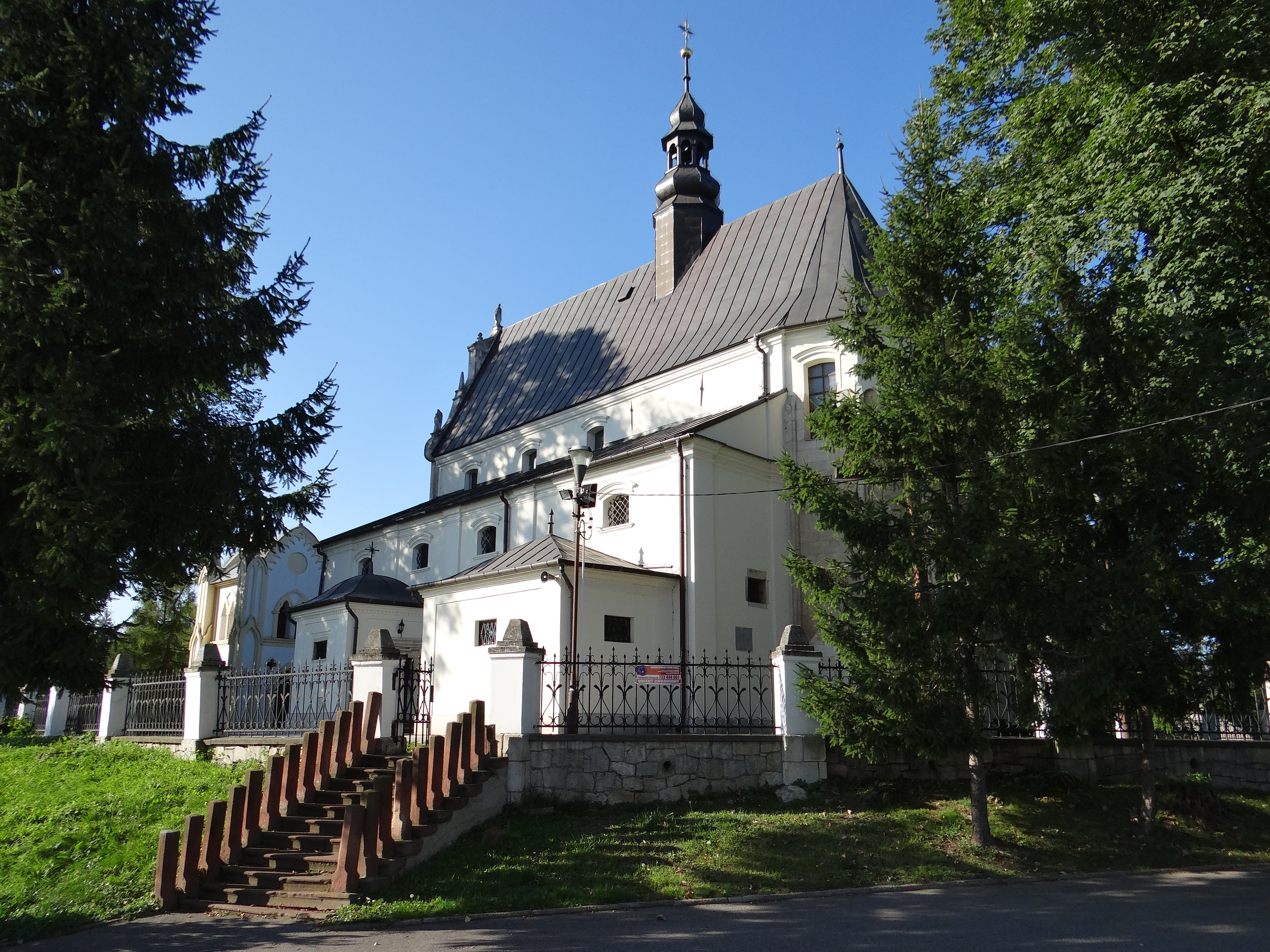
- Church of Saint Adalbert

- Location within Poland
- Coordinates: 50°11′54″N 20°23′28″E
- Country: Poland
- Voivodeship: Lesser Poland
- County: Proszowice
- Gmina: Proszowice

Population
  - Total: 540

Kościelec [kɔɕˈt͡ɕɛlɛt͡s] is a village in the administrative district of Gmina Proszowice, within Proszowice County, Lesser Poland Voivodeship, in southern Poland.

In the centre of the village is situated the Church of Saint Adalbert of Prague (Wojciech in Polish). It was founded in 1231 by the bishop of Kraków, Wisław Zabawa. The church is Romanesque in origin but rebuilt and restored many times, notably in the Baroque style.
