= Teresin, Lesser Poland Voivodeship =

Teresin
- Village
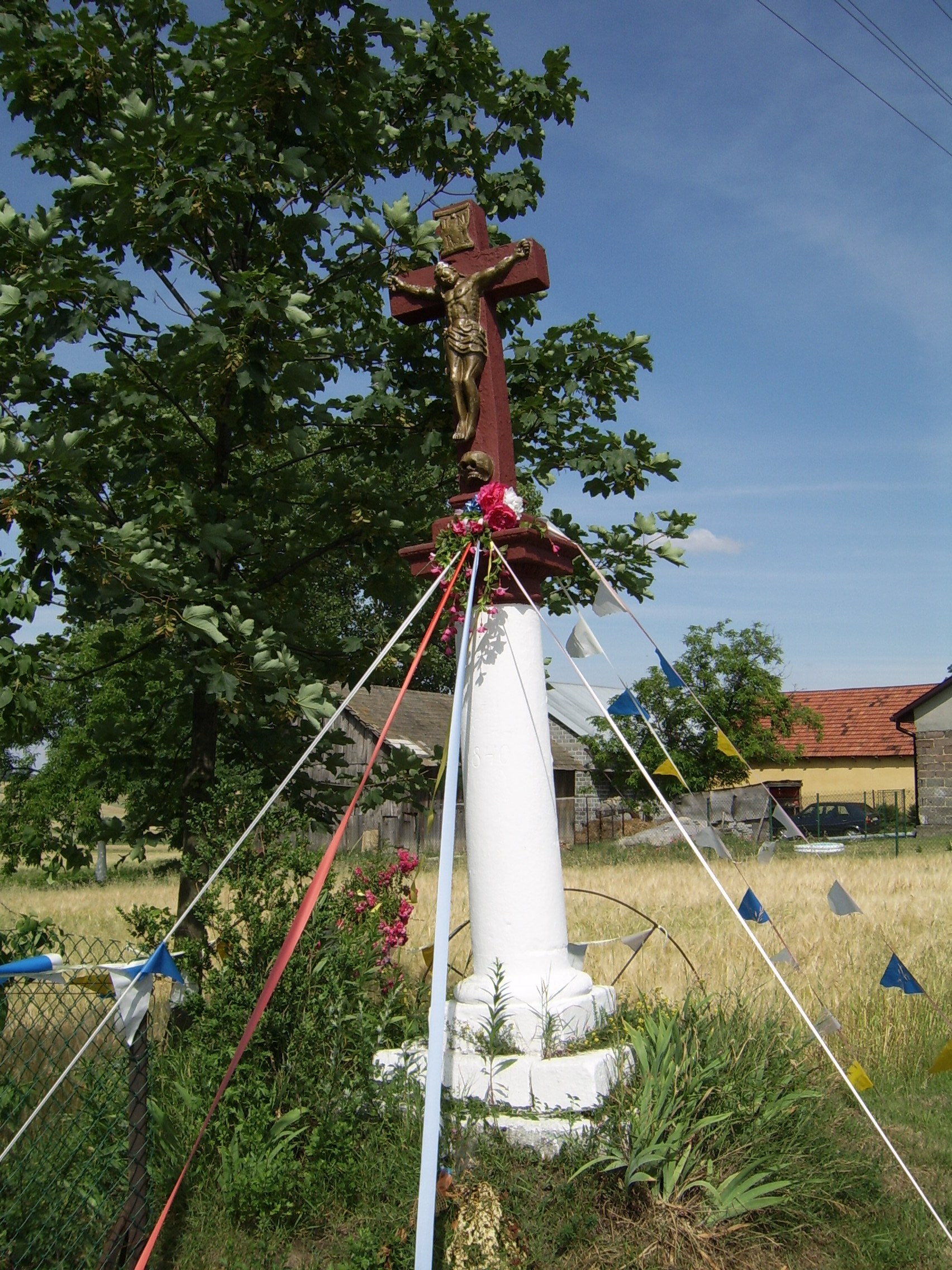

- Location within Poland
- Coordinates: 50°13′N 20°21′E
- Country: Poland
- Voivodeship: Lesser Poland
- County: Proszowice
- Gmina: Proszowice
- Population: 320

Teresin (Polish pronunciation: [tɛˈrɛɕin]) is a village in the administrative district of Gmina Proszowice, within Proszowice County, Lesser Poland Voivodeship, in southern Poland.
