= Szczytniki-Kolonia =

- Village
- Location within Poland
- Coordinates: 50°14′24″N 20°18′32″E
- Country: Poland
- Voivodeship: Lesser Poland
- County: Proszowice
- Gmina: Proszowice

Szczytniki-Kolonia [ʂt͡ʂɨtˈniki kɔˈlɔɲa] is a village in the administrative district of Gmina Proszowice, within Proszowice County, Lesser Poland Voivodeship, in southern Poland.
