= Makocice =

- Village
- Location within Poland
- Coordinates: 50°13′N 20°16′E
- Country: Poland
- Voivodeship: Lesser Poland
- County: Proszowice
- Gmina: Proszowice

Makocice [makɔˈt͡ɕit͡sɛ] is a village in the administrative district of Gmina Proszowice, within Proszowice County, Lesser Poland Voivodeship, in southern Poland.
