= Szreniawa, Proszowice County =

Szreniawa
- Village
- Location within Poland
- Coordinates: 50°12′14″N 20°18′52″E
- Country: Poland
- Voivodeship: Lesser Poland
- County: Proszowice
- Gmina: Proszowice

Szreniawa [ʂrɛˈɲava] is a village in the administrative district of Gmina Proszowice, within Proszowice County, Lesser Poland Voivodeship, in southern Poland.
