= Żębocin =

- Village
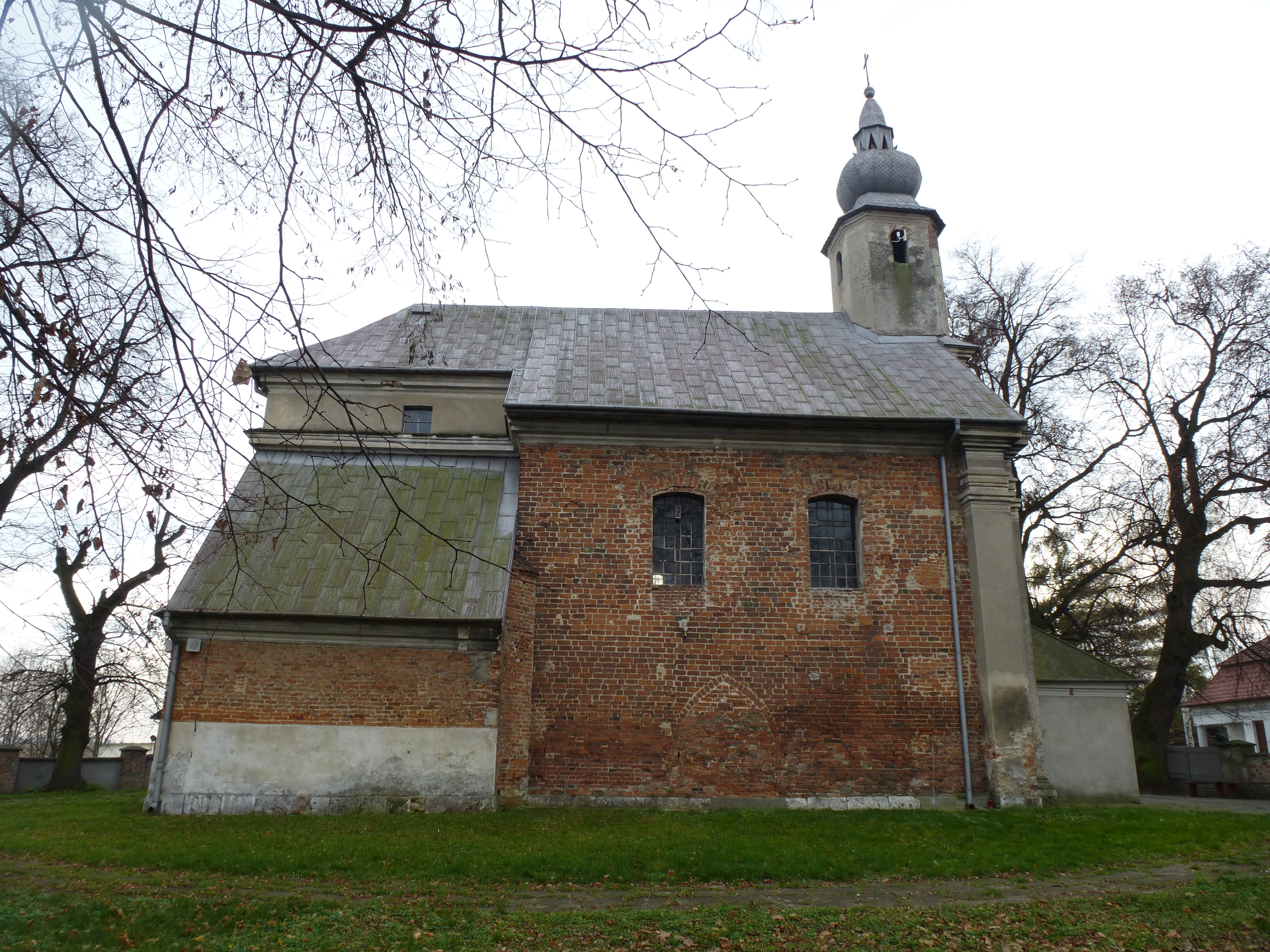
- Church of Saint Stanislaus

- Location within Poland
- Coordinates: 50°10′N 20°19′E
- Country: Poland
- Voivodeship: Lesser Poland
- County: Proszowice
- Gmina: Proszowice

Żębocin [ʐɛmˈbɔt͡ɕin] is a village in the administrative district of Gmina Proszowice, within Proszowice County, Lesser Poland Voivodeship, in southern Poland.
