= Kielce Cathedral =

Coordinates: 50.8689°N 20.6289°E

Cathedral Basilica of the Assumption of the Blessed Virgin Mary
- Bazylika katedralna Wniebowzięcia Najświętszej Maryi Panny w Kielcach
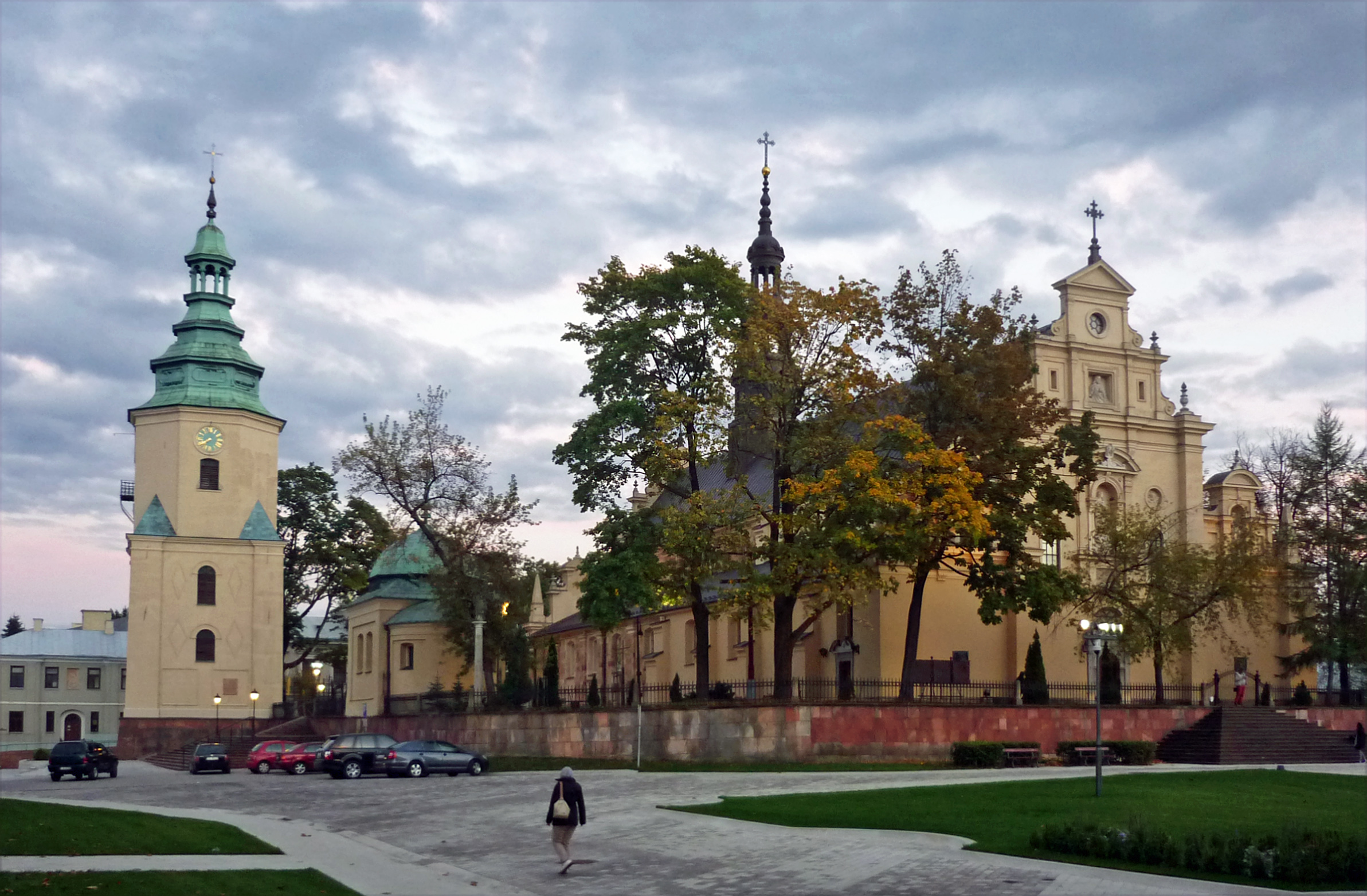
- Cathedral Basilica of the Assumption of the Blessed Virgin Mary
- Location: Kielce
- Country: Poland
- Denomination: Roman Catholic Church

The Cathedral Basilica of the Assumption of the Blessed Virgin Mary (Polish: Bazylika katedralna Wniebowzięcia Najświętszej Maryi Panny w Kielcach ) simplified to Kielce Cathedral, is a Roman Catholic church that has the status of cathedral and basilica located in the city of Kielce in Poland. It is located in the "Castle Hill" in the heart of the city, next to the former Palace of the Bishops of Kraków (now a Museum), also a famous landmark.

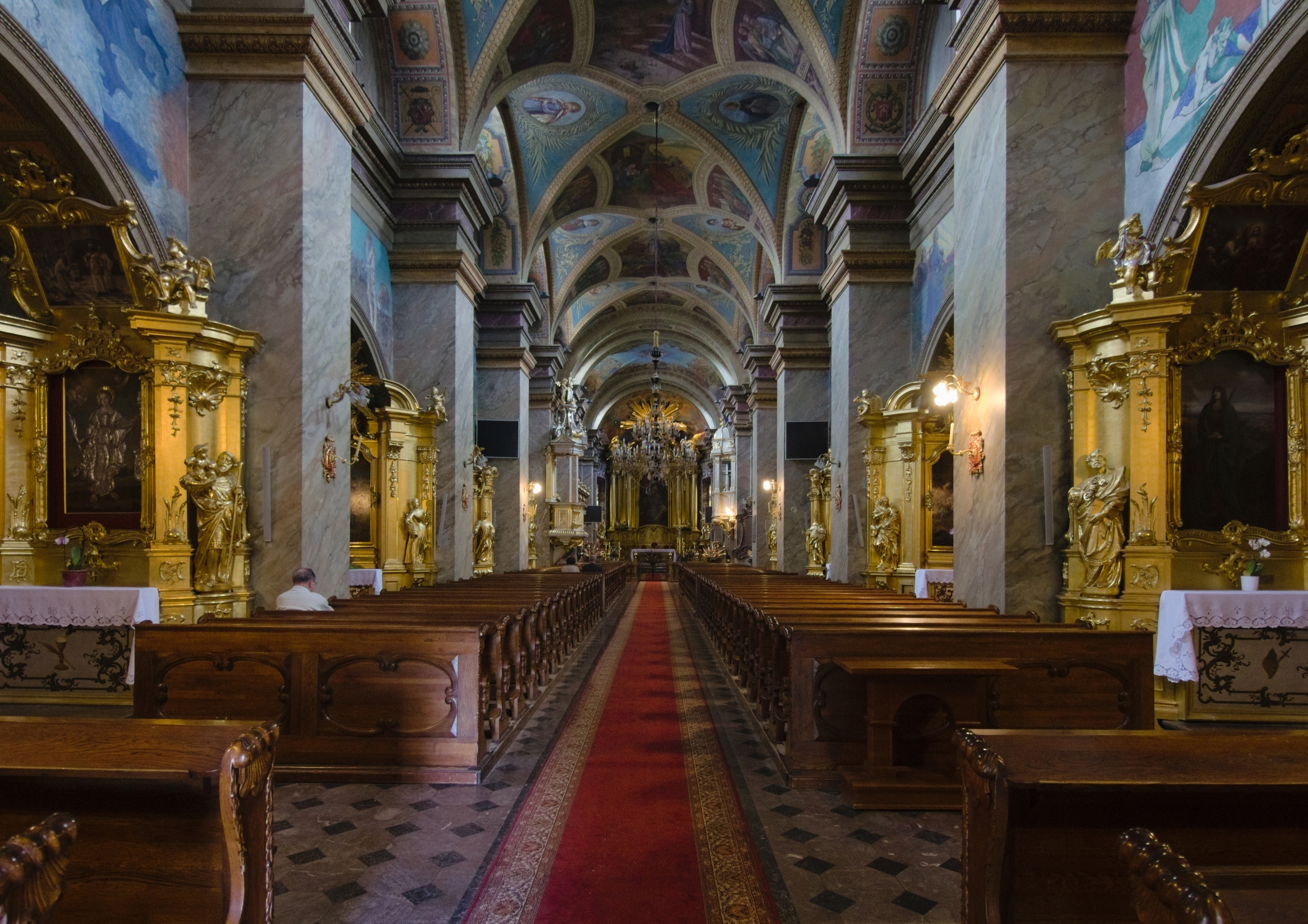
Internal view

It was built during the 12th century by the Bishop of Kraków, Gedeon. It was destroyed by the tartars in 1260. Then, in 1719 Bishop Kazimierz Lubienski began to reconstruct the building in the early Baroque style that still characterizes it. Inside, the three ships have a variety of colors in the frescoes of painters of the nineteenth century Kraków. The high altar, the work of Fontana, is also baroque and rococo style. The church became in 1805 the Cathedral of the new Diocese of Kielce.

The cathedral is a shrine of Our Lady of Graces (Matka Boża Łaskawa). The icon of Blessed Virgin Mary was crowned in 1636, but the silver-gold dress together with many votive offerings, left as thanksgivings, were stolen. It was crowned again in 1872.
