= The Bobbin, Clapham =

Pub in Clapham, London

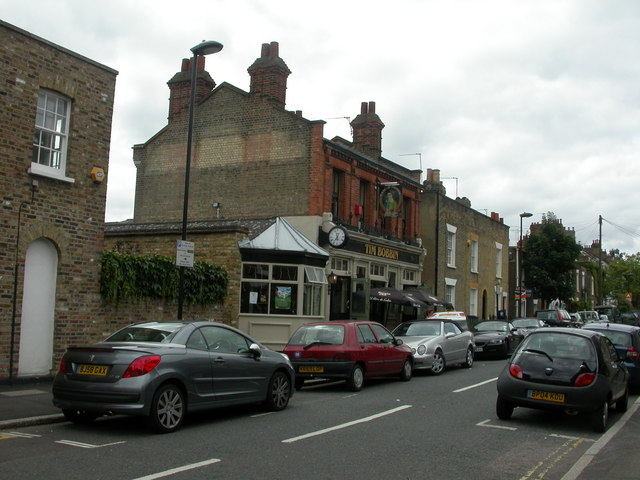
- The Bobbin, Clapham, 2009 (when it was still The Tim Bobbin)

- Location within London Borough of Lambeth Location within Greater London

General information
- Location: 1–3 Lillieshall Road, Clapham, London, England
- Coordinates: 51.466300°N 0.142840°W

Design and construction
- Designations

Listed Building – Grade II
- Official name: The Bobbin Public House
- Designated: 17 July 1978
- Reference no.: 1065039

The Bobbin is a pub at 1–3 Lillieshall Road, Clapham, London SW4.

It is a Grade II listed building, originally The Tim Bobbin, dating back to the late 19th century.
