= Bobin, Lesser Poland Voivodeship =

Bobin
- Village
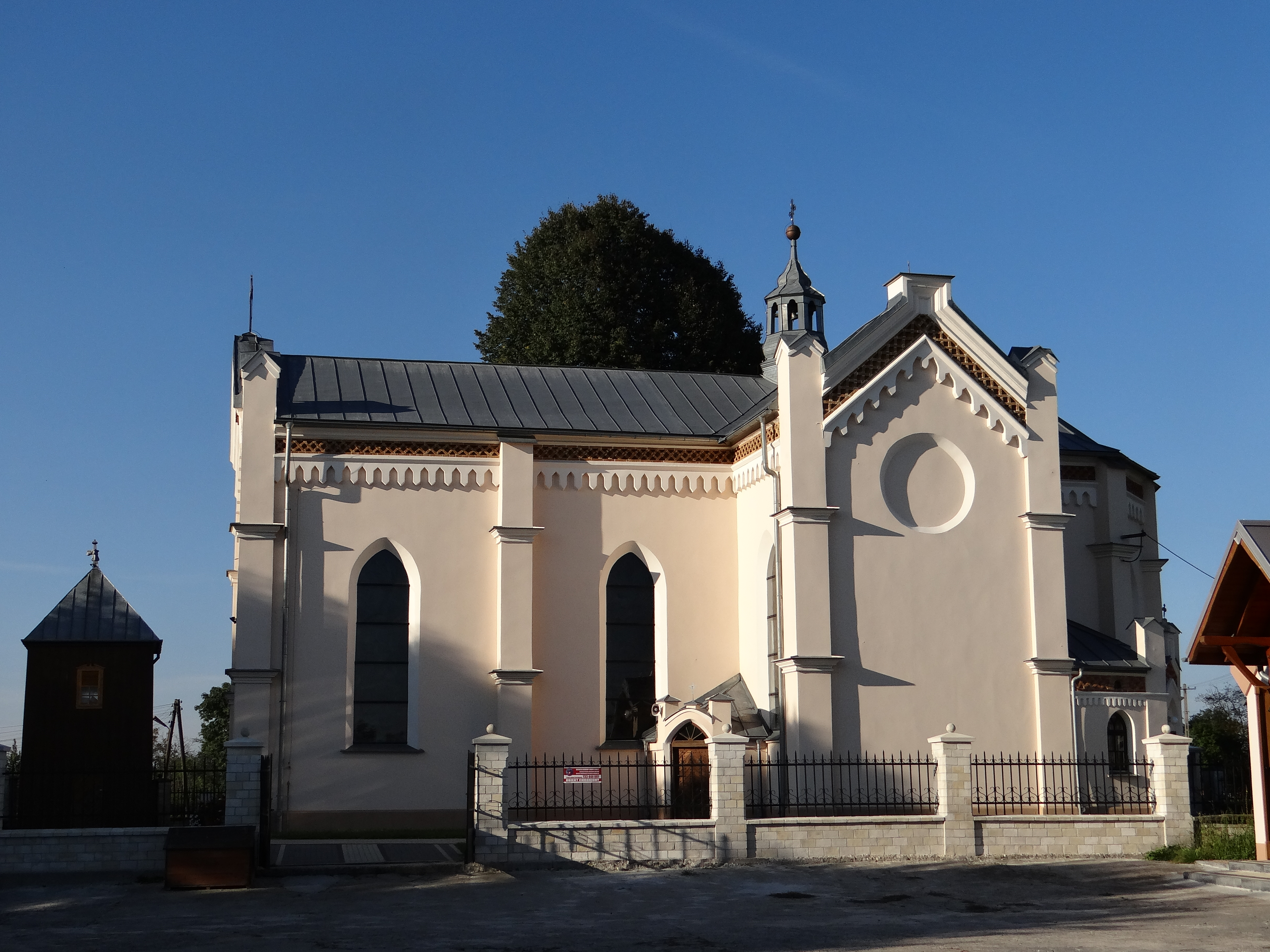
- Catholic church

- Location within Poland
- Coordinates: 50°10′43″N 20°26′19″E
- Country: Poland
- Voivodeship: Lesser Poland
- County: Proszowice
- Gmina: Proszowice

Bobin [ˈbɔbin] is a village in the administrative district of Gmina Proszowice, within Proszowice County, Lesser Poland Voivodeship, in southern Poland.
