= Sejm Constituency no. 32 =

Polish parliamentary constituency

Katowice III
- Constituency for the Sejm
- Location of Katowice III within Poland
- Counties: Będzin County; Dąbrowa Górnicza; Jaworzno; Sosnowiec; Zawiercie County
- Voivodeship: Silesia
- Population: 616 773 (2022)
- Electorate: 506,119 (2023)

Current Constituency
- Created: 2001
- Seats: 9
- Deputies: List: Waldemar Andzel (PiS); Mateusz Bochenek (PO-KO); Włodzimierz Czarzasty (The Left); Barbara Dolniak (PO-KO); Ewa Malik (PiS); Kamil Wnuk (Poland 2050); Katarzyna Stachowicz (PO-KO); Robert Warwas (PiS)
- Regional assembly: Silesian Voivodeship Sejmik
- Senate constituencies: 76 and 77
- EP constituency: 11 – Silesia

Katowice III, formerly known as Sosnowiec and officially known as Constituency no. 32 (Polish: Okręg wyborczy nr 32), is one of the 41 constituencies of the Sejm, the lower house of the Parliament of Poland, the national legislature of Poland. The constituency was established in 2001, after a major redistricting process across Poland. It is located in the Silesian Voivodeship and includes the area of three city counties: Dąbrowa Górnicza, Jaworzno and Sosnowiec as well as the counties of Będzin, Zawiercie, The constituency's district electoral commission is located in Katowice. (Note: The constituency's district electoral commission was located in Sosnowiec until 2019.) The constituency currently elects 9 of the 460 members of the Sejm using the open party-list proportional representation electoral system. At the 2023 parliamentary election it had 506,119 citizens eligible to vote.

== List of deputies ==
Deputies for the 10th Sejm (2023–2027)
Deputy	Party	Parliamentary group
Mateusz Bochenek	Civic Platform	Civic Coalition
Barbara Dolniak	Civic Platform	Civic Coalition
Wojciech Saługa	Civic Platform	Civic Coalition
Waldemar Andzel	Law and Justice	United Right
Ewa Malik	Law and Justice	United Right
Robert Warwas	Law and Justice	United Right
Włodzimierz Czarzasty	The Left	New Left
Łukasz Litewka (d. 2026)	The Left	New Left
Kamil Wnuk	Poland 2050	Poland 2050

== Election results ==
=== 2001 ===
2001 parliamentary election: Katowice III
Party	Votes	%	Seats
Democratic Left Alliance – Labour Union	174,467	62.40	7
Civic Platform	23,634	8.45	1
Self-Defence of the Republic of Poland	19,133	6.84	1
Law and Justice	18,625	6.66	–
Solidarity of the Right Electoral Action	11,837	4.23	–
League of Polish Families	11,111	3.97	–
Polish People's Party	10,796	3.86	–
Freedom Union	7,570	2.71	–
Alternative Social Movement	1,682	0.60	–
Polish Socialist Party	728	0.26	–
Total	279,583	100.00	9
Valid votes	279,583	97.35	
Invalid/blank votes	7,621	2.65	
Total votes	287,204	100.00	
Registered voters/turnout	592,280	48.49	
Source: National Electoral Commission

=== 2005 ===
2005 parliamentary election: Katowice III
Party	Votes	%	Seats
Civic Platform	57,562	27.21	3
Law and Justice	51,355	24.27	3
Democratic Left Alliance	44,738	21.15	2
League of Polish Families	15,349	7.25	1
Social Democracy of Poland	14,406	6.81	–
Polish People's Party	7,586	3.59	–
Liberty and Lawfulness	5,947	2.81	–
Democratic Party – demokraci.pl	5,577	2.64	–
Polish Labour Party	3,826	1.81	–
Patriotic Movement	2,431	1.15	–
Polish Confederation – Dignity and Work	1,339	0.63	–
Polish National Party	800	0.38	–
All-Polish Civic Coalition	656	0.31	–
Total	211,572	100.00	9
Valid votes	211,572	96.21	
Invalid/blank votes	8,331	3.79	
Total votes	219,903	100.00	
Registered voters/turnout	603,133	36.46	
Source: National Electoral Commission

=== 2007 ===
2007 parliamentary election: Katowice III
Party	Votes	%	Seats
Civic Platform	145,755	44.75	5
Law and Justice	81,360	24.98	2
Left and Democrats	70,378	21.61	2
Polish People's Party	16,381	5.03	–
Polish Labour Party	5,068	1.56	–
League of Polish Families	3,777	1.16	–
Self-Defence of the Republic of Poland	3,018	0.93	–
Total	325,737	100.00	9
Valid votes	325,737	98.28	
Invalid/blank votes	5,715	1.72	
Total votes	331,452	100.00	
Registered voters/turnout	600,155	55.23	
Source: National Electoral Commission

=== 2011 ===
2011 parliamentary election: Katowice III
Party	Votes	%	Seats
Civic Platform	120,530	43.00	5
Law and Justice	59,453	21.21	2
Palikot's Movement	41,504	14.81	1
Democratic Left Alliance	36,460	13.01	1
Polish People's Party	12,281	4.38	–
Poland Comes First	5,856	2.09	–
Polish Labour Party - August 80	2,185	0.78	–
Right Wing	2,051	0.73	–
Total	280,320	100.00	9
Valid votes	280,320	96.26	
Invalid/blank votes	10,901	3.74	
Total votes	291,221	100.00	
Registered voters/turnout	585,638	49.73	
Source: National Electoral Commission

=== 2015 ===
2015 parliamentary election: Katowice III
Party	Votes	%	Seats
Law and Justice	88,410	30.63	4
Civic Platform	72,755	25.21	3
United Left	39,774	13.78	–
Kukiz'15	29,161	10.10	1
Modern	25,522	8.84	1
KORWiN	13,682	4.74	–
Together	12,652	4.38	–
Polish People's Party	6,687	2.32	–
Total	288,643	100.00	9
Valid votes	288,643	98.03	
Invalid/blank votes	5,787	1.97	
Total votes	294,430	100.00	
Registered voters/turnout	564,891	52.12	
Source: National Electoral Commission

=== 2019 ===
2019 parliamentary election: Katowice III
Party	Votes	%	Seats
Law and Justice	124,553	37.13	4
Civic Coalition	99,499	29.66	3
The Left	73,466	21.90	2
Confederation Liberty and Independence	21,650	6.45	–
Polish People's Party	16,263	4.85	–
Total	335,431	100.00	9
Valid votes	335,431	99.10	
Invalid/blank votes	3,043	0.90	
Total votes	338,474	100.00	
Registered voters/turnout	537,371	62.99	
Source: National Electoral Commission

=== 2023 ===
2023 parliamentary election: Katowice III
Party	Votes	%	Seats
Civic Coalition	114,519	30.30	6
Law and Justice	112,389	29.74	3
The Left	81,646	21.60	2
Third Way	37,221	9.85	1
Confederation Liberty and Independence	21,512	5.69	–
Nonpartisan Local Government Activists	5,499	1.45	–
There is One Poland	5,173	1.37	–
Total	377,959	100.00	12
Valid votes	377,959	98.78	
Invalid/blank votes	4,676	1.22	
Total votes	382,635	100.00	
Registered voters/turnout	506,119	75.60	
Source: National Electoral Commission
