= Adam Śmigielski =

Polish Roman Catholic bishop

- Bishop of Sosnowiec
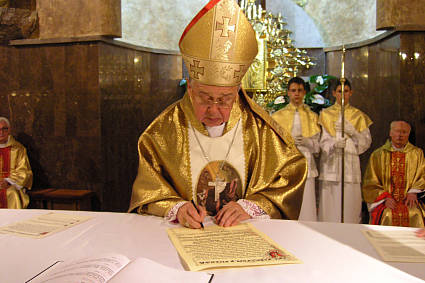
- Adam Śmigielski in December 2005
- Appointed: March 25, 1992
- In office: May 30, 1992 – October 7, 2008

Orders
- Ordination: June 30, 1957 by Piotr Kałwa
- Consecration: May 30, 1992 by Józef Glemp

Personal details
- Born: December 24, 1933 Przemyśl, Lwów Voivodeship, Second Polish Republic
- Died: October 7, 2008 (aged 74) Sosnowiec, Poland
- Motto: Da mihi animas

Adam Stefan Śmigielski (24 December 1933 in Przemyśl − 7 October 2008 in Sosnowiec) was a Polish Roman Catholic bishop.

Ordained to the priesthood on 30 June 1957, Śmigielski was named bishop of the Roman Catholic Diocese of Sosnowiec, Poland on 25 March 1992 and died of cancer while still in office on 7 October 2008.
