= Diocese of Kielce =

Roman Catholic diocese in Poland

Coordinates: 50.8689°N 20.6287°E

Diocese of Kielce Dioecesis Kielcensis Diecezja kielecka

Catholic
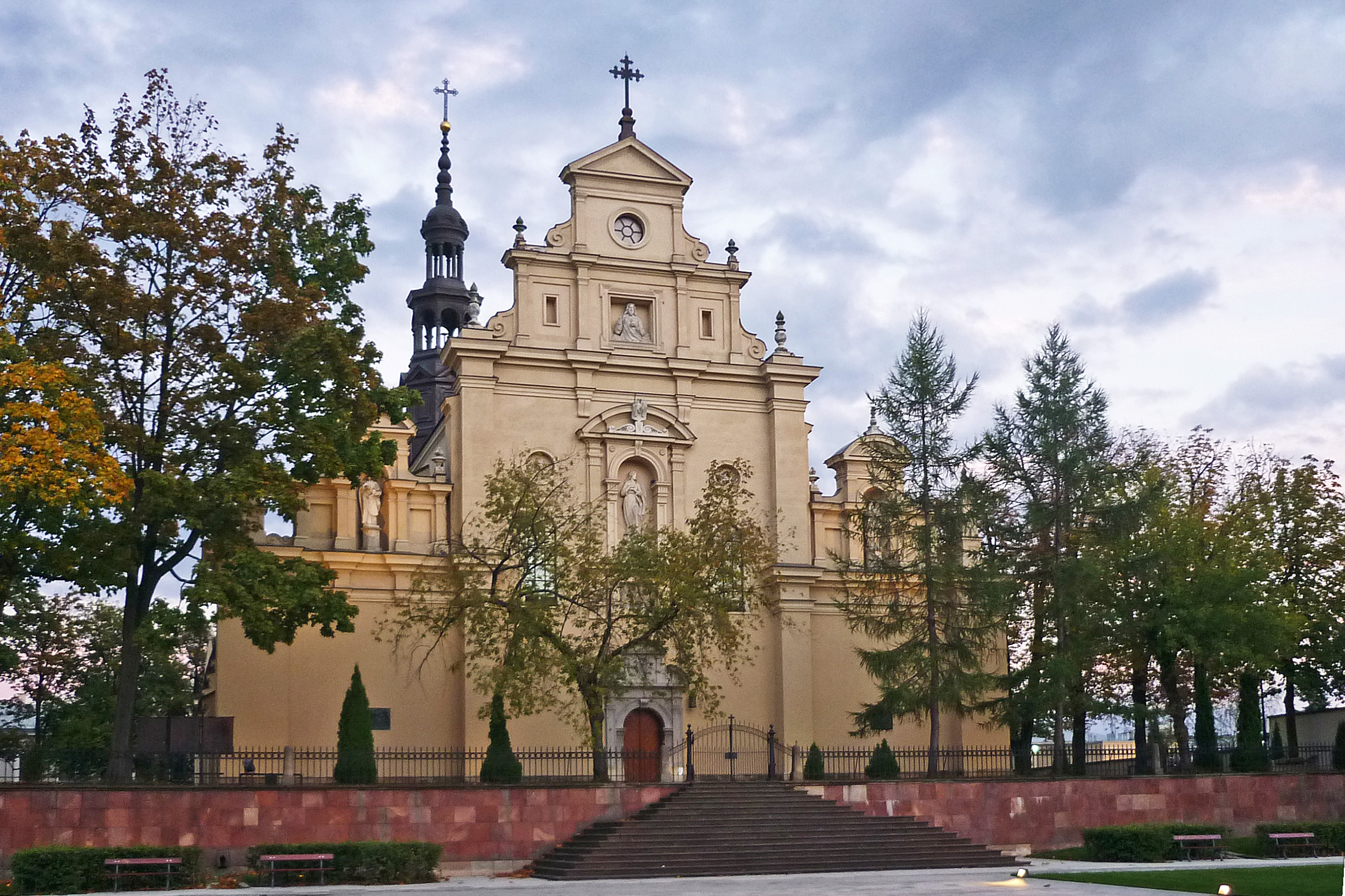
- Cathedral Basilica of the Assumption of the Blessed Virgin Mary in Kielce

Location
- Country: Poland
- Metropolitan: Kraków

Statistics
- Area: 8,319 km^{2} (3,212 sq mi)
- Population: Total; Catholics: (as of 2021); 811,981; 739,000 (91%)

Information
- Denomination: Catholic Church
- Rite: Latin Rite
- Cathedral: Bazylika Katedralna Wniebowzięcia; Najświętszej Marii Panny (Cathedral Basilica of the Assumption of the Blessed Virgin Mary)

Current leadership
- Pope: Leo XIV
- Bishop: Jan Piotrowski
- Auxiliary Bishops: Marian Florczyk; Andrzej Kaleta

Map

The Diocese of Kielce (Latin: Dioecesis Kielcensis) is a Latin diocese of the Catholic Church located in the city of Kielce in the ecclesiastical province of Kraków in Poland.

Its Cathedral Basilica of the Assumption of the Blessed Virgin Mary in Kielce is listed as a Historic Monument of Poland.

== History ==
- 1805: Established as Diocese of Kielce from the Diocese of Kraków
- 1818: Suppressed
- December 28, 1882: Restored as Diocese of Kielce

== Special churches ==
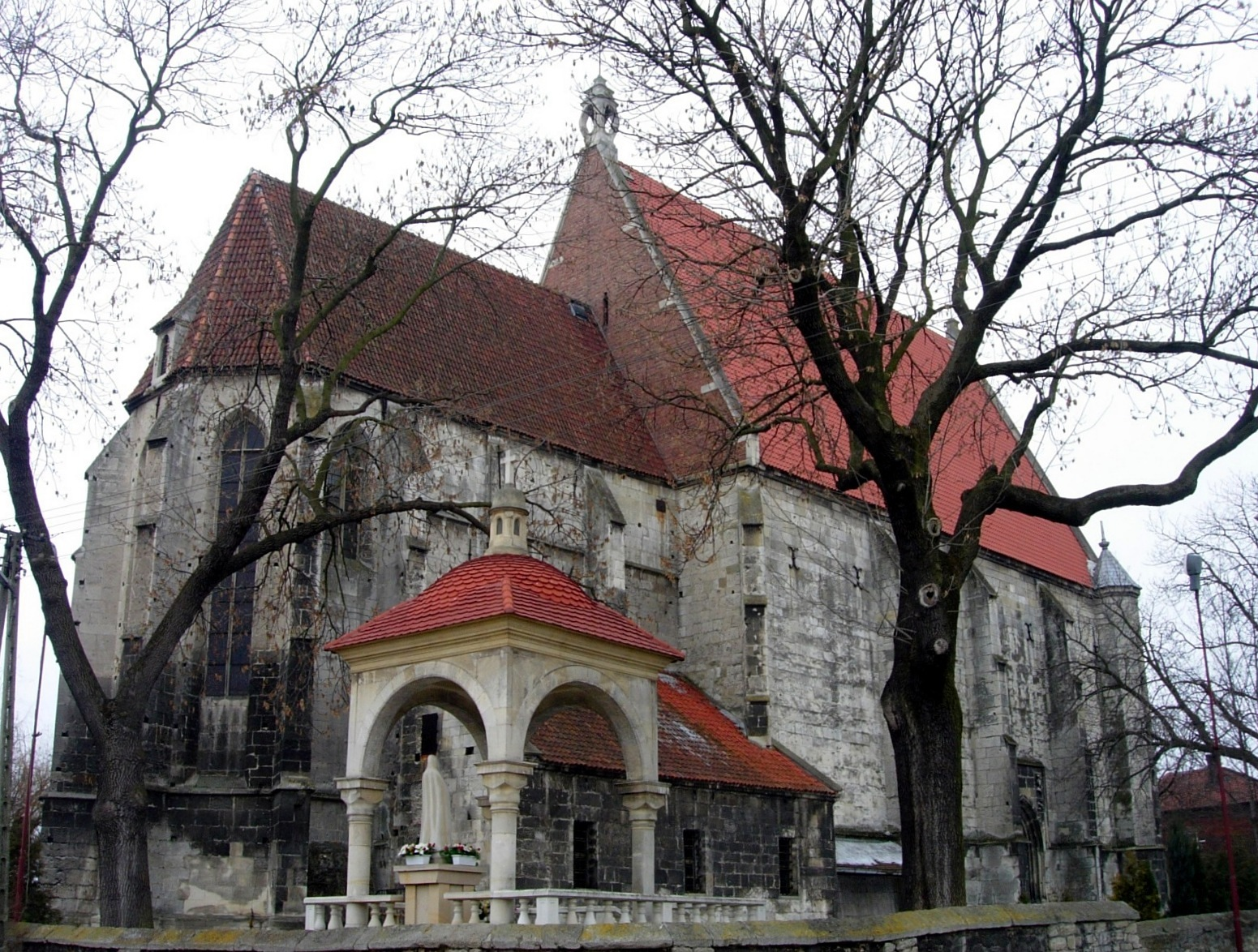
Bazylika Narodzenia Najświętszej Maryi Panny, Wiślica

- Minor Basilicas:
  - Bazylika Grobu Bożego, Miechów
  - Bazylika Narodzenia Najświętszej Maryi Panny, Wiślica (Basilica of the Birth of the Blessed Virgin Mary)

== Bishops ==
- Bishop Wojciech Górski (1805.06.26 – 1818.02.01)
- Bishop Tomasz Teofil Kuliński (1883.03.15 – 1907.01.08)
- Bishop Augustyn Łosiński (1910.04.26 – 1937.03.03)
- Bishop Czesław Kaczmarek (1938.05.24 – 1963.08.26)
- Bishop Jan Jaroszewicz (1967.03.20 – 1980.04.17)
- Bishop Stanisław Szymecki (1981.03.27 – 1993.05.15), appointed Archbishop of Białystok
- Bishop Kazimierz Ryczan (1993.07.17 – 2014.10.11)
- Bishop Jan Piotrowski (since 2014.10.11)

=== Auxiliary Bishops ===
- Marian Florczyk (1998-)
- Jan Gurda (1972-1993)
- Kazimierz Gurda (2004-2014), appointed Bishop of Siedlce
- Jan Jaroszewicz (1957-1967), appointed Bishop here
- Mieczyslaw Jaworski (1982-2001)
- Andrzej Kaleta (2017-)
- Tomasz Teofil Kuliński (1872-1883), appointed Bishop here
- Edward Henryk Materski (1968-1981), appointed Bishop of Sandomierz
- Edward Jan Muszyński (1960-1968)
- Piotr Skucha (1986-1992), appointed auxiliary bishop of Sosnowiec
- Szczepan (Stefano) Sobalkowski (1957-1958)
- Franciszek Sonik (1935-1957)

=== Another priest of this diocese who became bishop ===
- Henryk Mieczysław Jagodziński, appointed nuncio and titular archbishop in 2020

== Reports of Sexual Abuse ==
In May 2019, a documentary called Tell No One was released featuring a priest identified as Jan A., who served the Diocese in the town Topola, who confessed to molesting young girls. Officials in the Diocese had previously investigated claims made against Jan A. and sent collected evidence to the Vatican in January 2019.

== See also ==
- Roman Catholicism in Poland
- The Lesser Polish Way

== Sources ==
- GCatholic.org
- Catholic Hierarchy
- Diocese website
