= Ostrów, Proszowice County =

Ostrów
- Village
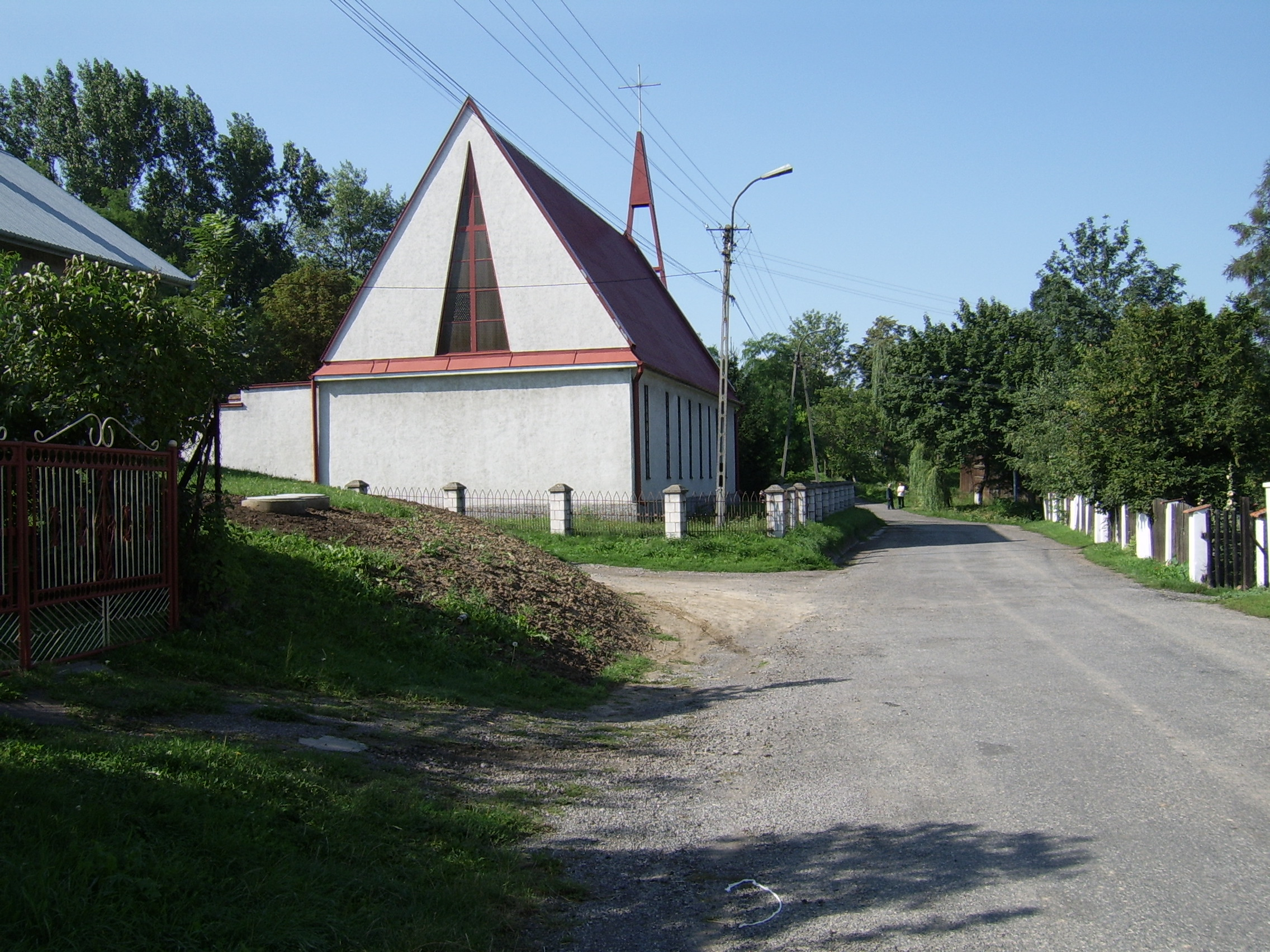
- Catholic chapel

- Location within Poland
- Coordinates: 50°14′3″N 20°21′41″E
- Country: Poland
- Voivodeship: Lesser Poland
- County: Proszowice
- Gmina: Proszowice
- Population: 700

Ostrów [ˈɔstruf] is a village in the administrative district of Gmina Proszowice, within Proszowice County, Lesser Poland Voivodeship, in southern Poland.
