= Klimontów, Lesser Poland Voivodeship =

Klimontów
- Village
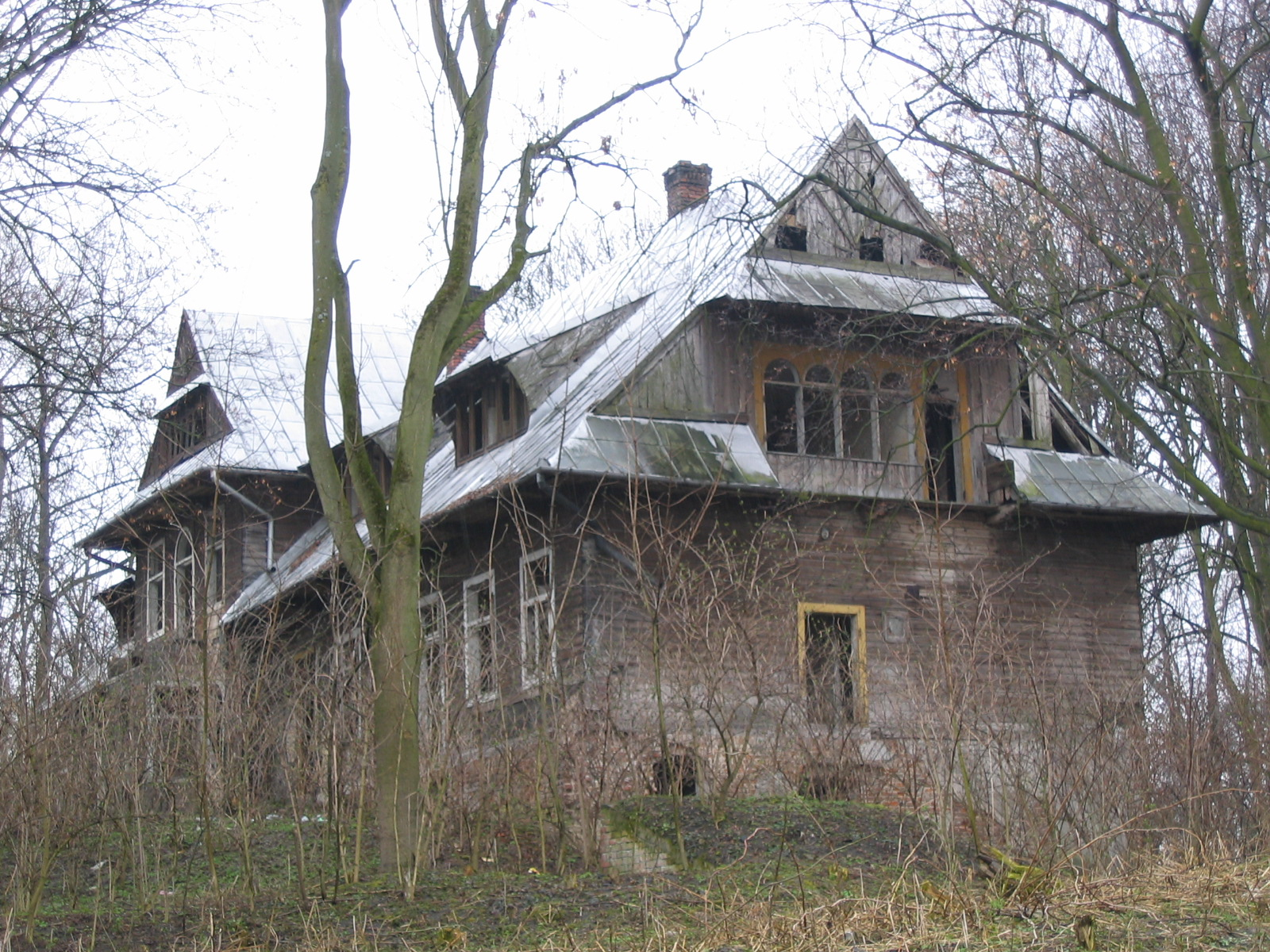
- Manor house

- Location within Poland
- Coordinates: 50°13′19″N 20°18′19″E
- Country: Poland
- Voivodeship: Lesser Poland
- County: Proszowice
- Gmina: Proszowice
- Population (2011): 1,377

Klimontów [kliˈmɔntuf] is a village in the administrative district of Gmina Proszowice, within Proszowice County, Lesser Poland Voivodeship, in southern Poland.
