= Artur Ważny =

21st-century Polish Catholic bishop

- Bishop of Sosnowiec
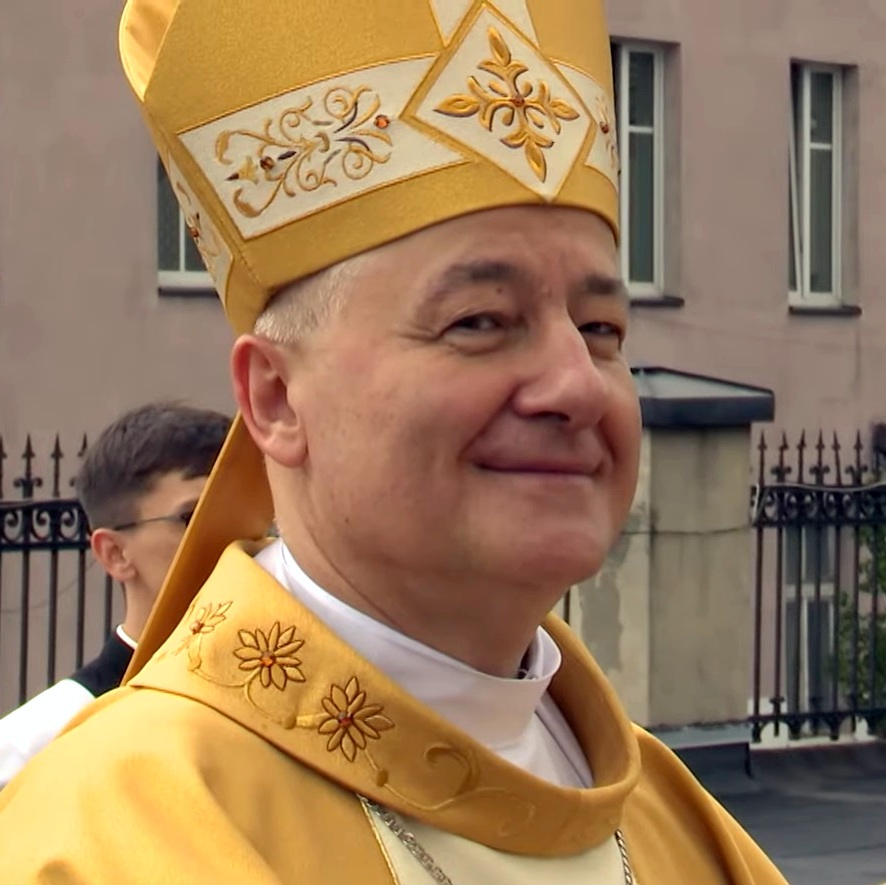
- Artur Ważny (2024)
- Church: Roman Catholic Church
- Province: Częstochowa
- In office: 8 May 2024 –
- Other post: Titular Bishop of Mazaca
- Previous post: Auxiliary Bishop of Tarnów (2020–2024)

Orders
- Ordination: 25 May 1991 by Józef Życiński
- Consecration: 30 January 2021 by Andrzej Jeż
- Rank: Bishop

Personal details
- Born: 12 October 1966 (age 59) Rzeszów, Poland
- Motto: Patris corde
- Coat of arms

Artur Ważny (born 12 October 1966) is a Polish Roman Catholic bishop, being Bishop of the Roman Catholic Diocese of Sosnowiec as well as Titular Bishop of Mazaca and former Auxiliary Bishop of the Roman Catholic Diocese of Tarnów.

== Biography ==
=== Early life ===
Ważny was born on 12 October 1966 in Rzeszów. In the years 1985–1991 he studied philosophy and theology at the Major Seminary in Tarnów. Ważny was ordained as a Presbyter on 25 May 1991 at the Tarnów Cathedral by the Bishop of Tarnów, Józef Życiński. He received his Licentiate of Sacred Theology in Pastoral theology at the Cardinal Stefan Wyszyński University, Warsaw.

=== Ordination as Bishop ===
On 12 December 2020, Pope Francis appointed him as the new Auxiliary Bishop of the Roman Catholic Diocese of Tarnów as well as the Titular Bishop of Mazaca. He was consecrated on 30 January 2021 in the Church of the Blessed Virgin Mary Queen of Poland in Tarnów by the Bishop of Tarnów, Andrzej Jeż, with the help of the apostolic nuncio to Poland Salvatore Pennacchio and the Archbishop of Lublin, Stanisław Budzik. For his episcopal motto, he chose "Patris corde" (A fatherly heart).

On 23 April 2024, Pope Francis appointed him as the new Bishop of the Roman Catholic Diocese of Sosnowiec, a position he officially undertook on 8 May 2024.
