= Pontifical Council for the Family =

Christian religious council

The Pontifical Council for the Family was a pontifical council of the Curia of the Roman Catholic Church from 1981 to 2016. It was established by Pope John Paul II on 9 May 1981 with his motu proprio Familia a Deo Instituta, replacing the Committee for the Family that Pope Paul VI had established in 1973. The Council fostered "the pastoral care of families, protects their rights and dignity in the Church and in civil society, so that they may ever be more able to fulfill their duties."

Its functions were shifted to the new Dicastery for the Laity, Family and Life on 1 September 2016.

== Description ==
The Council "worked for a deeper understanding of the Church’s teaching"; "encouraged studies in the spirituality of marriage and the family"; worked "to ensure the accurate recognition of the human and social conditions of the family institution everywhere"; and "strove to ensure that the rights of the family be acknowledged and defended even in the social and political realm" and "supported and coordinated initiatives to protect human life from the first moment of conception and to encourage responsible procreation." More particularly, the Council "promoted and coordinated pastoral efforts related to the issue of responsible procreation, and encouraged, sustained and coordinated initiatives in defense of human life in all stages of its existence, from conception to natural death."

The Council's last President was Archbishop Vincenzo Paglia. In addition to its advisory board of Bishops, members of the Council included laypeople, especially married laypeople "from all over the world."

On 6 June 2006, the Council published a document entitled Family and Human Procreation, noting that "Never before has the natural institution of marriage and the family been the victim of such violent attacks."

== Presidents ==
- Committee for the Family:
  - Maurice Roy 11 January 1973 – 16 December 1976
  - Opilio Rossi 10 December 1976 – 9 May 1981
- Council for the Family:
  - James Knox 4 August 1981 – 26 June 1983
  - Edouard Gagnon 7 July 1983 – 8 November 1990
  - Alfonso López Trujillo 8 November 1990 – 19 April 2008
  - Ennio Antonelli 7 June 2008 – 26 June 2012
  - Vincenzo Paglia 26 June 2012 – 1 September 2016
