= Dolany =

Dolany may refer to places:

== Czech Republic ==
- Dolany (Kladno District), a municipality and village in the Central Bohemian Region
- Dolany (Klatovy District), a municipality and village in the Plzeň Region
- Dolany (Náchod District), a municipality and village in the Hradec Králové Region
- Dolany (Olomouc District), a municipality and village in the Olomouc Region
- Dolany (Pardubice District), a municipality and village in the Pardubice Region
- Dolany (Plzeň-North District), a municipality and village in the Plzeň Region
- Dolany nad Vltavou (until 2016 Dolany), a municipality and village in the Central Bohemian Region
- Dolany, a village and part of Červené Pečky in the Central Bohemian Region
- Dolany, a village and part of Čkyně in the South Bohemian Region
- Dolany, a village and part of Hluboká (Chrudim District) in the Central Bohemian Region
- Dolany, a village and part of Jičíněves in the Hradec Králové Region
- Dolany, a village and part of Mladkov in the Pardubice Region

== Poland ==
- Dolany, Lesser Poland Voivodeship, south Poland
- Dolany, Greater Poland Voivodeship, west-central Poland

== See also ==
- Doljani (disambiguation)
