= Malkowice =

Malkowice or Małkowice may refer to:

- Malkowice, Lesser Poland Voivodeship (south Poland)
- Malkowice, Świętokrzyskie Voivodeship (south-central Poland)
- Małkowice, Lower Silesian Voivodeship (south-west Poland)
- Małkowice, Opole Voivodeship (south-west Poland)
- Małkowice, Subcarpathian Voivodeship (south-east Poland)

== See also ==
- Malkowitz (disambiguation)
