= Revindication of Orthodox churches in the Second Polish Republic =

Series of actions by Polish governments

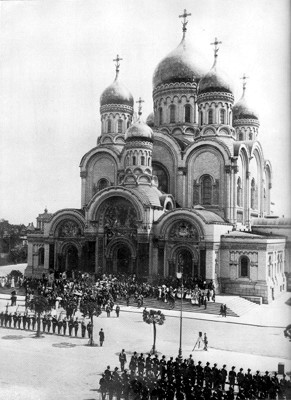
The Alexander Nevsky Cathedral, one of the most famous of the churches destroyed in the first half of the 1920s due to their recognition as symbols of Russification

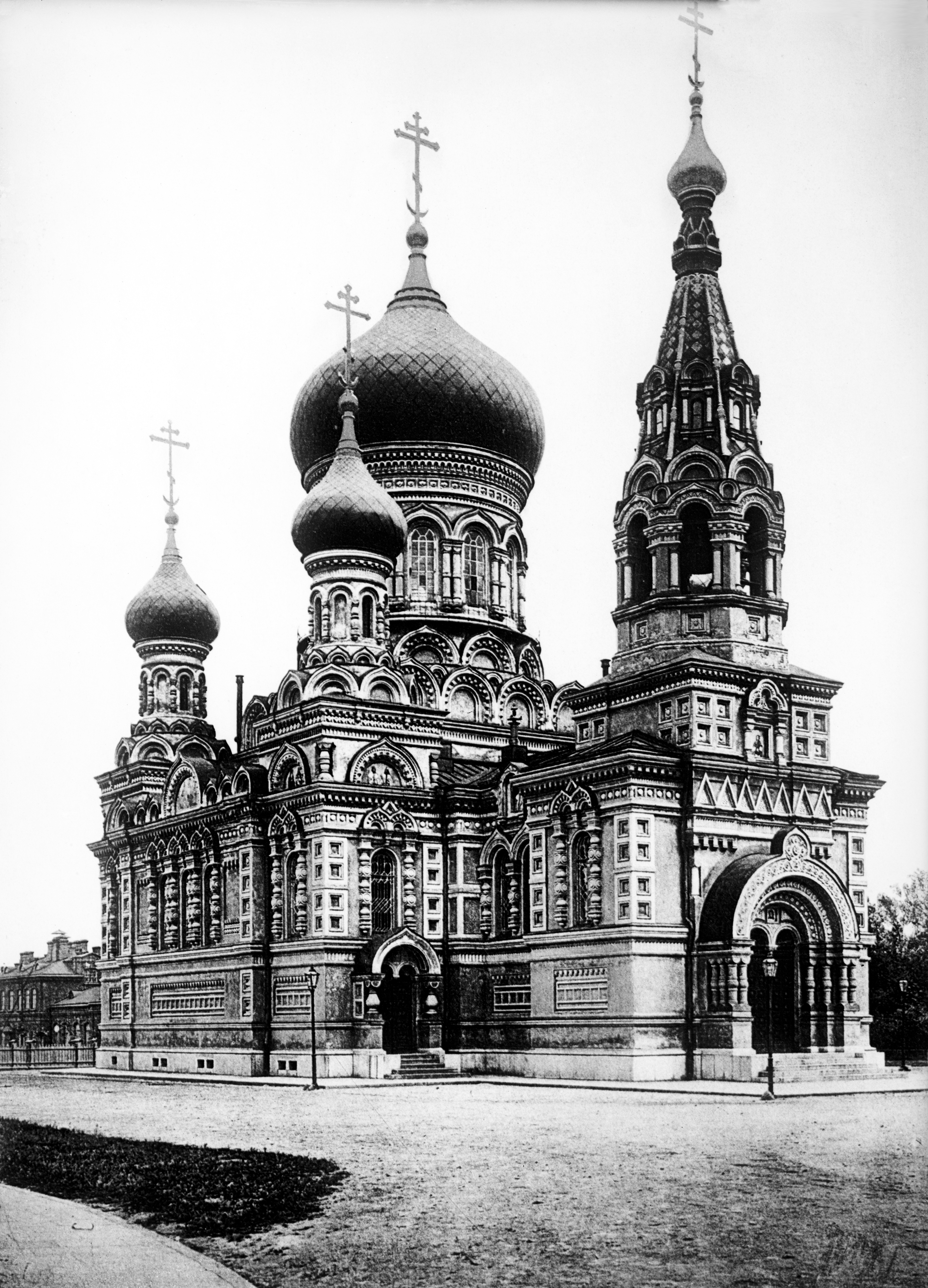
The Church of the Archangel Michael, which was demolished in 1923

The series of actions led by successive governments of the Polish state from 1919 to 1939. In particular steps were taken from 1919 to 1924, 1929 to 1934, and 1937 to 1938.

The restitution action formed part of the general policy of the Second Republic against the Polish Orthodox Church, which aimed to minimize the social and political influence of the Russian, Ukrainian, and Belarusian national minorities. An important motive was also a strong hostility to the Orthodox Church, a religion which was seen as a representative of the partitioning powers on Polish soil, as well as the memory of the dissolution of Roman Catholic monasteries in the Russian Empire. Action was initially through spontaneous takeovers of churches by Catholics and in later stages by pre-prepared government plans. Orthodox churches were torn down, closed, adapted to become Roman Catholic churches (as many were originally) or public buildings.

According to surviving documents from 1937 to 1938 the goal was total Polonization of areas west of the Bug River (traditionally seen as the border between Catholic and Orthodox Poland) and to maximise Polish cultural influences east of it. These plans were not implemented because of the outbreak of World War II and because of the attitude of the Orthodox Church.

== Legal status of the Orthodox Church ==
On December 16, 1918, the Polish chief of state issued a decree in which all assets of the Orthodox Church in Poland were put under the administration of the state. Formally, this step was justified by the need to protect the assets of churches abandoned after World War I, during the Bieżeństwo (the mass exodus of the Orthodox populations from western areas of the then Russian Empire in the face of approaching German troops). In fact, in the first years of the existence of the independent Second Polish Republic, numerous parish churches and monasteries had no hosts. The decree did not lose validity even when the population and Orthodox clergy returned to the occupied territories after the war, and after the March constitution guaranteed freedom of religion. Consent to re-open churches and their use for the purpose of worship was issued by the state administration and could not be granted without detailed justification. In 1919, the Ministry of Religious Affairs and Public Education (Ministerstwo Wyznań Religijnych i Oświecenia Publicznego (MWRiOP) ordered seals attached to inactive Orthodox churches, declaring they would take a more comprehensive decision on the Orthodox churches at a later time. In practice, this led to their permanent closures. A July 9, 1919, decree extended this to lands joined to Poland after the Treaty of Riga.

A second decree, the Regulation Commissioner General Directorate of Civil Eastern Territories of October 22, 1919 (rozporządzenie Komisarza Generalnego Zarządu Cywilnego Ziem Wschodnich), known as the lex Żeligowski, only related to areas east of the Bug River. It commanded the return of all church buildings to be operated by the Roman Catholic Church, however it did not address the issue of churches belonging to the Eastern Catholic Churches. Some problems relating to the nationality of the church buildings that had been taken also developed in 1922's temporary regulations on the relationship of government to the Orthodox Church in Poland, which mainly dealt with issues of liturgical language, meeting organisation, conventions, diocesan councils, territorial division of the diocese, education, clergy and Orthodox co-fraternities. After the publication of the temporary regulations, the Orthodox Church was also required to present a complete inventory of existing churches and monasteries, as well as a list of the clergy and the estimated number of its faithful.

It was only from 1938 to 1939 when statutory solutions to ownership of sacred objects were enacted. In addition to resuming the language issue (it was forbidden to issue religious statements in a language other than Polish), regulation of issues related to the training of religious personnel and the requirement for prayers for the Polish state, the document partially raised the issue of property with more detailed solutions for the next draft law. It set a limit on the area of church property that was not subject to division at 180 ha for a metropolis, 150 ha for a bishopric, 125 ha for a consistory, and 180 ha for a monastery. On 30 June 1939, by another regulation, the state recognised the belonging to the Orthodox Church of those estates that were still in its hands - it was a total of 52,200 ha of land (before 1918, the Orthodox had 146,000 ha of land at their disposal).

== The first wave of the recovery from 1919 to 1924 ==
=== Spontaneous actions by Catholics ===
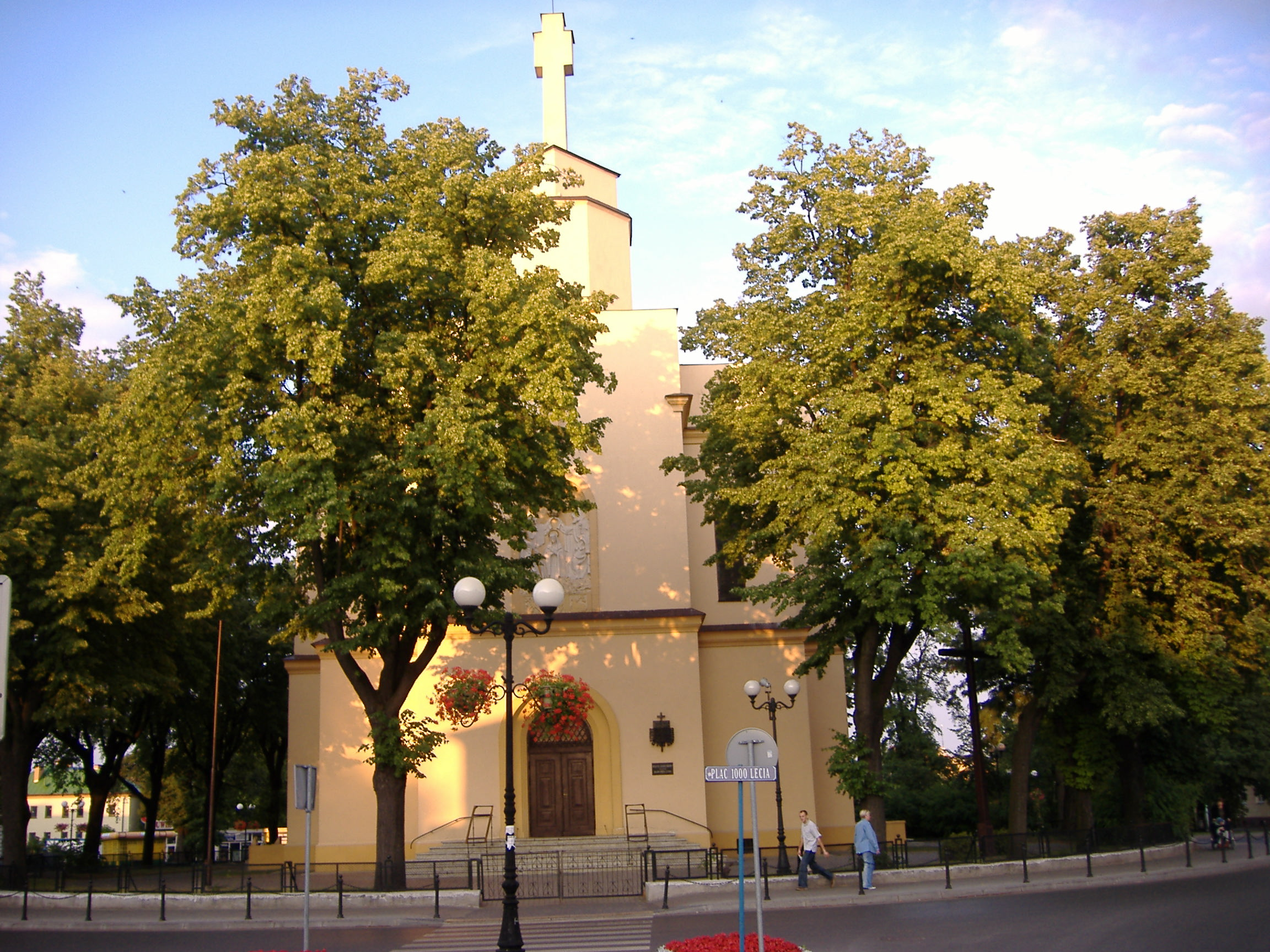
The former Orthodox church in Siedlce, converted in 1919 to become a Roman Catholic church

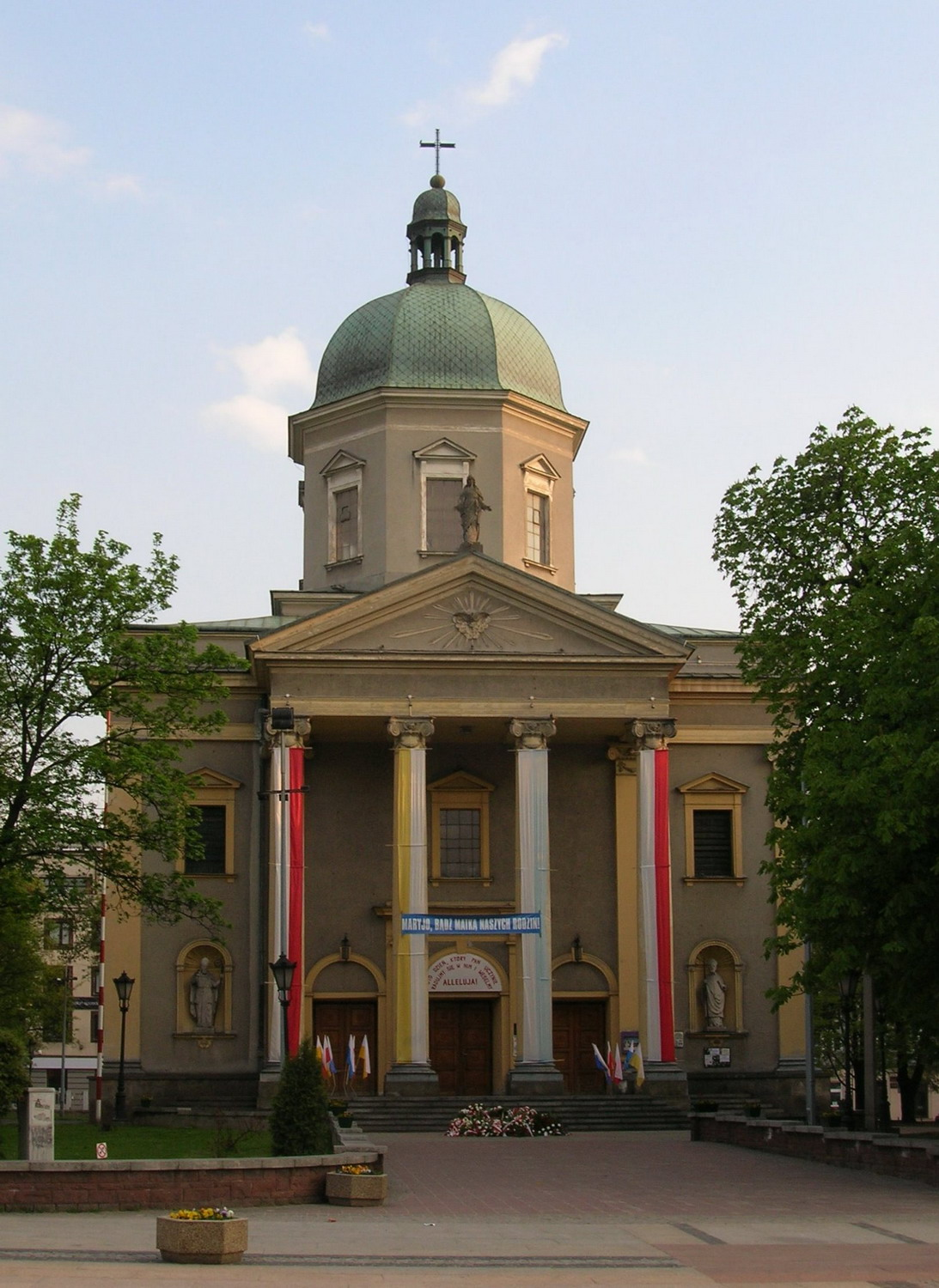
The Garrison Church in Constitution Square, Radom, was formerly an Orthodox church

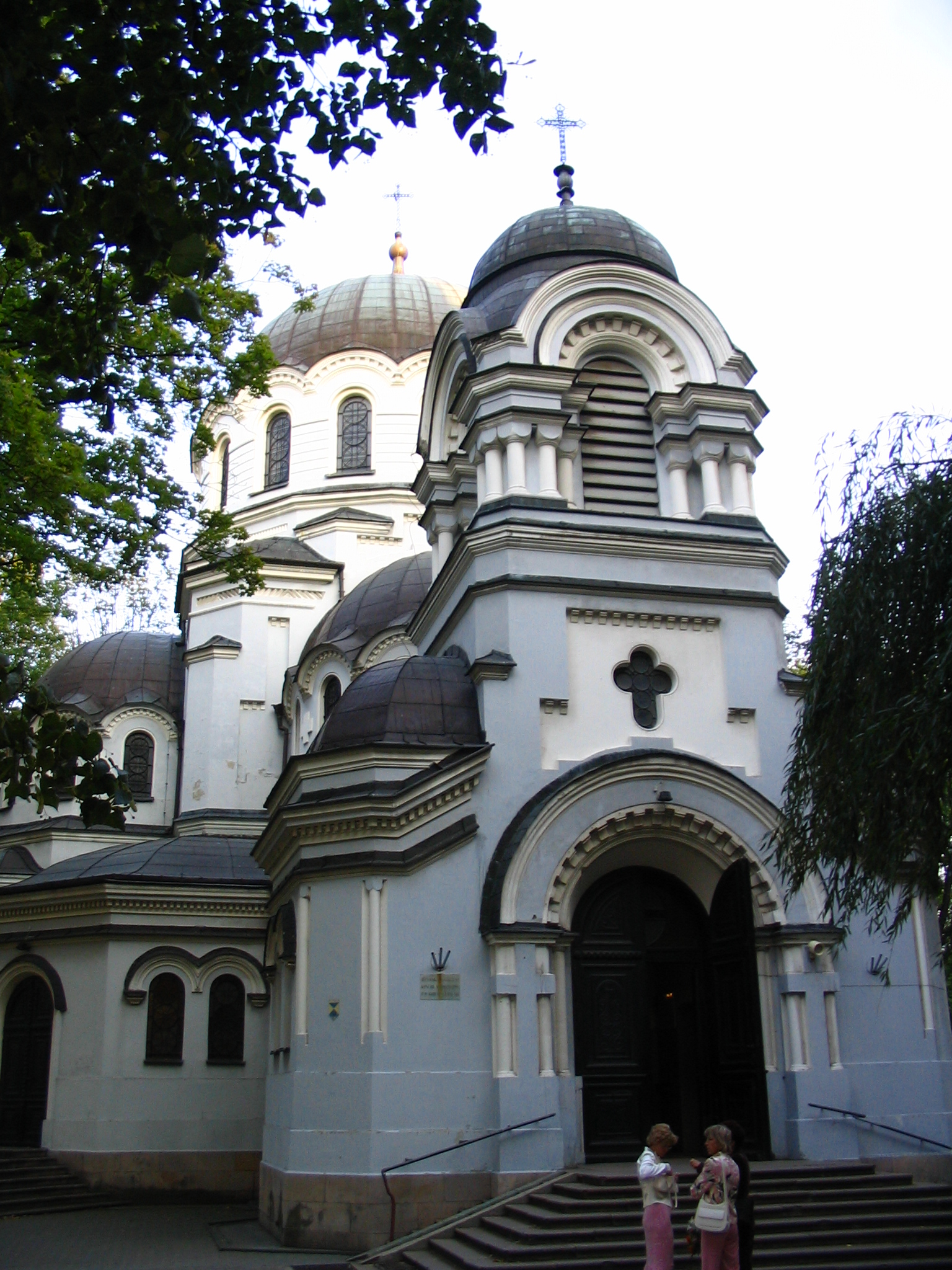
The Garrison Church in Kielce, is located in a former Orthodox church

During the first wave of the recovery, there were spontaneous actions by local Roman Catholic communities in order to take over Orthodox churches for their own use or to close or destroy them. Such an attitude was a reaction to the earlier policies of the Tsarist government, which treated the construction of new Orthodox churches as part of their policy of Russification and often built them in areas where there wasn't a need, or quite consciously constructed them in areas to symbolise Russian rule. These activities most often did not have the consent of state or local authorities, at best the consent of church authorities.

In some areas, the latter encouraged the faithful to take over churches: the bishop of Podlaskie, Henryk Przeździecki, issued a special decree on 11 December 1918, which called for the priests of his diocese to immediately restore to the Roman Catholic Church all Orthodox churches which had been originally established as Catholic churches (even those set up as Eastern Catholic churches). He also ordered the immediate reopening of all Roman Catholic churches and chapels closed by the Tsarist authorities. The response to the bishop's call was so great that by 1920, Przeździecki changed his ordinance, leaving the decision open on the fate of specific objects seized from the Orthodox church. Performing these actions was much easier after World War I and the October Revolution because the Orthodox church was in organisational chaos. In 1915, retreating Russian troops often took church equipment with them, especially those from the numerous Orthodox military churches. Many Orthodox clergy left too, gradually returning after 1918.

A specific feature of the first wave was also the recovery and the destruction of churches seen as symbols of Russian rule, such as the Alexander Nevsky Cathedral in Warsaw or the Church of Saints Cyril and Methodius (Cerkiew Świętych Cyryla i Metodego) in Chełm (commemorating the liquidation of the Eastern Catholic diocese of Chelm in 1875). This happened both spontaneously and (in the case of the cathedral in Saxon Square) after longer discussions at governmental level. Churches were demolished in Aleksandrów Kujawski, Grajewo, Janów Lubelski, Jędrzejów, Kalisz, Kolno, Kozienice, Lubartów, Lublin, Łask, Łomża, Mława, Modlin Fortress, Opoczno, Osowiec, Ostrów Mazowiecka, Pińczów, Płońsk, Przasnysz, Pułtusk, Raczki, Radomsko, Raduczu, Rawa Mazowiecka, Różan, Rypin, Sieradz, Sierpc, Skierniewice, Słupca, Sosnowiec, Suwałki, Tomaszów Mazowiecki, Warsaw (6 locations), Włocławek and other locations. Some of these places, which did not find their way into the hands of the Catholics, were adapted for secular purposes, for example a former Orthodox church in Ostrołęka became a scrap yard, one in Skierniewice became a granary, and one in Staszów, a theatre.

=== The attitude of state authorities ===
The government didn't display a unified position regarding the recovery of churches. Political pressure and pressure from the Catholic Church came in the initial stages, when specific inquiries about the fate of the Orthodox church were considered to favour Catholics. The government was often not thought to have any opinion, which allowed for spontaneous solutions to the problem. The belief of a government bias against it caused much bitterness within the Orthodox Church.

In practice, the Polish government sought to limit any possible influence of the Orthodox Church, minimising the number of active parishes and Polonizing Orthodox churches associated not only with the Tsar, but — as time went on to an even greater extent - with the Ukrainian national movement. Thus, there were differences in policies for the individual regions. The areas inhabited by an overwhelming majority of Orthodox believers were not massively Catholicised, however measures were carried out to subordinate the hierarchy of the Orthodox church. On the other hand, they totally tried to deny the Orthodoxy in Chełm and Podlasie, according to the declaration by Lublin governor Stanislaw Moskalewski, who in 1921 announced that: "the country west of the Bug River was purely Polish." In a similar vein, the MWRiOP commented in a February 5, 1924, letter that "the Lublin province should strive to Polonize Orthodoxy or displace it in favour of the Roman Catholic Church". Earlier, in 1919, it was established that 5,000 faithful was the norm for the creation of permanently functioning Orthodox parish, while removing the clergy of a closed church would hold back the local population from demanding that it re-open. Back in the 1920s there were cases where a church which had been closed at the request of the population, would re-open for a particularly important holiday, then the practice disappeared, because, according to the governor of Lublin, such temporary openings "evoke bitterness in the population and unwanted reflections". Another constant feature of state policy towards the Orthodox church was not issuing construction permits for new churches or for the renovation of existing ones damaged during World War I. Only the governor of the Volyn province, Henryk Józewski, inquired of the MWRiOP whether it could not be more flexible to approve applications for the construction of houses of prayer. This eventually earned a command to send any application that the office deemed appropriate in for evaluation at a central level. The Minister stated that it "MWRiOP in principle is opposed to the erection of new houses of worship in places where a fixed Pastoral base is provided for".

In 1921, the MWRiOP completed work on the first draft of the Act completing the issue of the church, which clearly resolved the issue of ownership of Roman Catholic and Eastern Catholic churches in favour of the Roman Catholic Church and the Ministry reserved the right to decide the fate of any church built on state land with state funds or from contributions of the population. The government discussed this project on December 15, 1921, but in fear of the outbreak of mass Orthodox discontent, completely abandoned its consideration. The text was then supplemented with a caveat that a church, even located in a former Catholic church, can remain in the hands of the Orthodox church if it is actively used by the Orthodox community. This solution, however, was conditional on the consent of the bishop of the appropriate Catholic diocese.

However, on May 24, 1921, progress of recovery actions in the Lublin region and local interfaith relations exacerbated the situation to such an extent that the MWRiOP had to not only prohibit further occupation of the churches, but also suspend the execution of orders already obtained by Catholics. The relevant regulation was sent to provincial governors. Despite this, proposals and memoranda concerning churches were still received subsequently and had repeated conflicting situations, although on a smaller scale. The most famous location transferred to Catholics after the formal termination was the recovery of a monastery in Zahorowie (Cerkiew Świętych Piotra i Pawła w Zahorowie).

In 1925, the Presidium of the Council of Ministers adopted theses responding to the problem of the recovery of the current state of possession of churches with the Orthodox churches and Catholic churches resolving future disputes by mutual agreement, the acquisition of inactive churches by the government, and opening closed churches in the case of real needs of the local community. Declarations of religious liberty and the equality of the two religions, however, had practical consequences. The document was rejected by Bishop Henryk Przeździecki. Przeździecki was also outraged by the placing of the two religions on the same level.

The problem of church ownership was repeatedly on parliamentary agendas, being raised by different groups. On July 28, 1922, at the request of the Administrative Commission, the Sejm adopted a resolution in which the government was called upon to submit a resolution, which would regulate the issue of the return of Catholic objects confiscated by the Tsarist regime (it did not refer to whether the objects were of Roman Catholic or Eastern Catholic origin though). Since it did not have an adequate resolution, the Committee on the Constitution began to receive large numbers of letters about specific churches and monasteries, written by local Catholics. The Commission moved debate on the issue in the Sejm to 8 February 1924. The result was resolutions in the first Parliament demanded a law regulating the issue, and the second individual administration confirmed recovery of a Catholic church in Lutsk. Ukrainian MPs demanded a third resolution, which asked for Parliament to restrain from further Orthodox property acquisitions until the publication of the relevant act. This proposal was rejected.

=== The reaction of the Orthodox Church and the faithful ===
The reactions of the population and the Orthodox clergy to the restitution actions was varied. Reclamation of some churches wasn't met with resistance because they were closed, especially in the case of Orthodox churches taken and converted from earlier Roman Catholic or Eastern Catholic churches. Actions only triggered strong controversy in areas inhabited by a large percentage of the Orthodox church followers, where controversial facilities were actively being used by the local population. Both sides tried to gain the support for its case with the local authorities and the government, writing memoranda and relying on the harm suffered in the past (by Catholics) or by the guaranteed freedom of religion (by the Orthodox). The Orthodox faithful also had the support of Belarusian and Ukrainian organizations, which strengthened their case in Polish national policy. The Lublin Provincial Governor stated that "the issue of closed churches is the starting point of action of anti-state subversive elements, preying on the dissatisfaction of the population, as well as Ukrainian nationalists seeking influence among the population".

There were often clashes and the destruction of Orthodox property, and people were wounded and arrested. In 1919, during the forced retaking of the Narodzenia Bogurodzicy na Górce Orthodox church in Chełm, a mob destroyed the tombs of Orthodox and Eastern Catholic bishops. In turn, the church's ordination ceremonies at Catholic churches were often arranged in very sumptuous ways, arranging the occasions as "manifestations of being Polish" and sometimes coincided with a conflict between the faithful of both religions. In Ubrodowice, a group of Catholics seeking to take over the Św. Eliasza church, defended by 60 Orthodox people, were injured. In response to these actions the Metropolitan of Warsaw and the entire Polish Orthodox leadership formally approved the pre-existing practice of celebrating major events by sending priests to closed Orthodox churches, encouraging this kind of action. The MWRiOP then demanded a limit to such activities, citing the presence of the strong political emphasis during this type of worship.

Recovery actions in the first years of independence was also commented on in the press. Leon Radziejowski, in a Rzeczpospolita article titled "Playing with fire", noted that while the actions of Tsarist authorities taking Catholic churches was illegal, the issue of the fate of the controversial buildings directly threatened to have an undermining internal effect. Critical voices on the recovery of churches also appeared in the pages of the foreign press.

=== The result of the first wave of the recovery ===
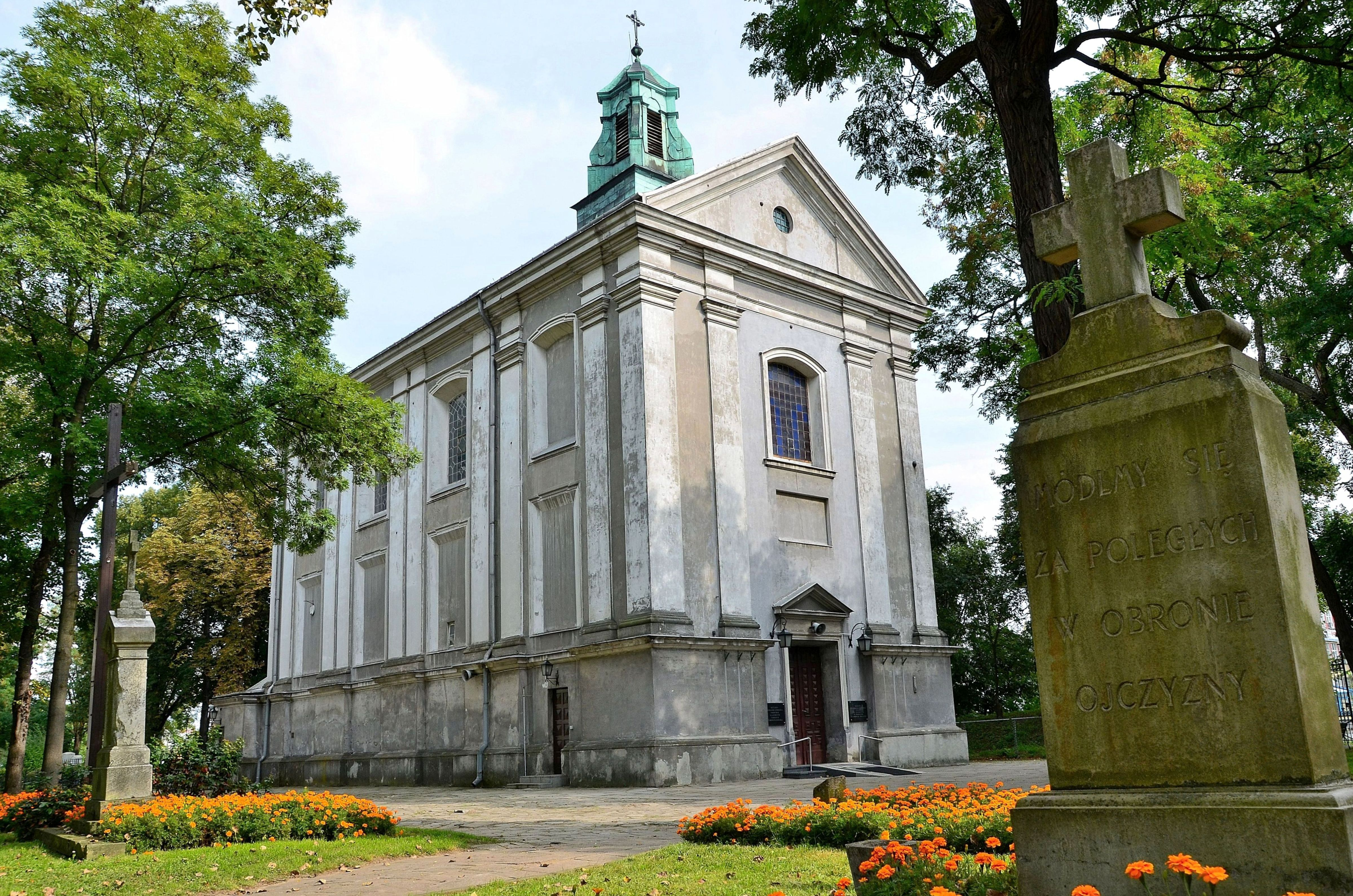
St. Lawrence's Church in Warsaw, was in 1834 changed into an Orthodox church named for Our Lady of Vladimir, and in 1916 became a Catholic church once again

According to estimates by the Ministry in 1914, 630 Orthodox churches operated in Polish lands located in former Eastern Catholic premises and 240 were formerly Roman Catholic churches. In the course of actions to reclaim churches, Roman Catholics took over 175 originally Eastern Catholic churches, and 140 formerly Roman Catholic churches. The Orthodox church still controlled 350 churches and 80 buildings. Other facilities were closed, destroyed or transferred to secular use, with nearly 70% of the churches taken over by Roman Catholics by spontaneous actions without the permission of the authorities.

During the first wave of the recoveries, state authorities also took parts of the estates and buildings of Orthodox monasteries when their pre-war inhabitants did not return. This happened in the case of female monasteries in Berezwecz, Leśna, Radecznica, Różanystok, Teolin, Turkowice, Wirów, and a male monastery in Supraśl. In turn, the Roman Catholic Church reclaimed a female monastery: St. Marii Magdaleny in Vilnius (furnished by the Tsarist authorities with objects taken from the Sisters of the Visitation), the church of St. Mikołaja in Dubno (in buildings which were originally Cistercian) and buildings in Volodymyr-Volynskyi and Zahorów Nowy.

Konstanty Srokowski, reporting to Prime Minister Władysław Sikorski on the final results of the actions, did not speak enthusiastically about them and wrote that the Catholic rationale for actions east of the Bug River, whose population had an Orthodox majority, became "increasingly more slender and doubtful".

== The second wave of the recovery from 1929 to 1934 ==
=== Attempts at recovery through the courts and demolishing "unnecessary churches" in 1929 ===
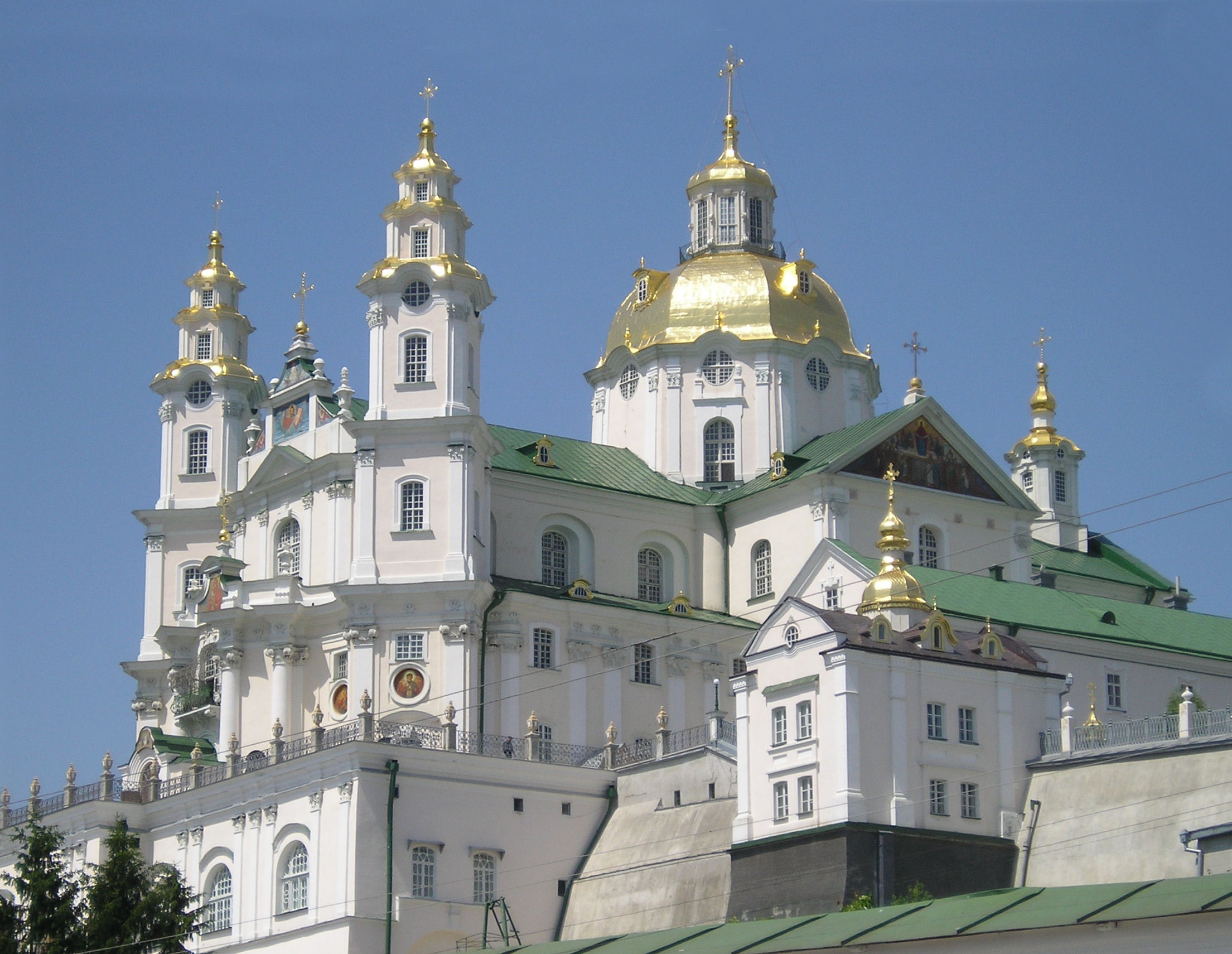
Pochayiv Lavra, the famous Orthodox monastery, whose transfer Catholics demanded in court

A characteristic feature of this period was the adoption of legal tactics by the Catholic Church. The Archbishop of Vilnius Romuald Jałbrzykowski, the Bishop of Lutsk, Adolf Szelążek, and the Bishop of Pinsk, Zygmunt Łoziński filed a total of 755 lawsuits against various entities about 553 objects from the past including 202 of Roman Catholic origin. (Note: Sources give the number of 553 or 555 churches.) Among them were requests for the return of objects that played a special role in the life of the Orthodox clergy - the Dermań and Pochayiv Lavra monasteries, the monastery and the church of the Holy Spirit in Vilnius, and monasteries in Kremenets, Zimno and Zhyrovichy. They repeatedly filed lawsuits related to churches in villages with an overwhelming majority of Orthodox people (in 65 cases, in villages where there was a disputed church and no Catholics), or places that throughout their entire existence were Orthodox (the Monastery of St. Onuphrius in Jabłeczna only stayed Orthodox because of opposition from the Governor of Lublin).

The Catholic church was well aware that if the Orthodox church conceded to all the legal actions, it would deprive them of a third of the religious buildings in their possession. The Catholic News Agency, commenting on the case, allowed for the possibility that civil unrest would result, but constantly emphasized the need to redress wrongs suffered in the time of the annexation. They did realise however that the number of lawsuits caused issues with not only the Orthodox, but caused doubts among the Catholic faithful, so they issued large numbers of brochures arguing that it was possible to re-transfer disputed objects, and that they would abandon pastoral work in places where there were no Catholics.

Discussion on restitution was even more lively than during the first wave of church acquisitions, and at the same time, the issue of property of the Eastern Catholic Church was raised, questioning the right of Roman Catholics to take over those objects, which should legally have been returned to the Eastern Catholic Church.

The Roman Catholic Church created a bad impression by their undervaluations of the disputed objects, for example, the Pochayiv Lavra monastery and its assets were valued at 2,000 złoty. In their actions, the Roman Catholic Church in Poland got clear support from the Holy See, but the Greek Catholic Metropolitan Andrey Sheptytsky, warned against new religious coercion. To defend themselves, the Metropolitan of Warsaw Dionizy (Waledyński) published a special pastoral letter, in which he called upon the faithful to raise money for the legal defence. The act of raising funds also involved the clergy, and a committee coordinating all activities was appointed. Publicly, Catholic bishops justified their lawsuits by consistently claiming that their only concerns were buildings that historically and legally belonged to the Roman Catholic Church.

In 1929, the state authorities also planned to demolish "unnecessary" churches, specifically to demolish 97 buildings. Parallel to this was the policy of keeping a number of churches closed, even when they were in Orthodox areas. This time the action was met with a sharp protest from the Orthodox community, the Ukrainian parliamentary representation and the hierarchy of the Orthodox Church. On October 26, 1929, in the Metropolitan's pastoral letter, he called for the unification of the entire Orthodox community in Poland, sacrifice to pay for legal assistance, and prayer. Russian and Ukrainian organisations (a special committee chaired by Serhij Chruckyj developed and published documents relating to the recovery of churches) additionally appealed to the Sejm. Protests also flowed in from the Ukrainian Orthodox Church and from outside Poland, with protests held in Europe, the US and Japan, and one of the organisations even appealed to the League of Nations. Meanwhile, the Minister of Education Czerwinski, when repeatedly asked by MPs about the fate of the Ukrainian Orthodox Church, pretended to be unfamiliar with the topic. He assured them that there were no plans to demolish churches and that he was not aware of cases of desecration of religious objects. Finally, the overwhelming attitude of the Orthodox community meant that fewer churches (23 of them) were destroyed than had initially been planned.

=== The government's position ===
The official position of the government on the issue of the recovery of churches was expressed by minister Sławomir Czerwiński in January 1930, declaring the need to take into account the demands of all faiths. The government was strongly supportive of concepts of the Catholicism of the eastern borderlands and continued the predetermined policy of Polonizing the Polish Orthodox Church and limiting the development of their religion. On the other hand, government circles feared activism within the Orthodox and Ukrainian communities, as well as violence. Therefore, it is considered dangerous to leave matters in the hands of the court. Eventually, on January 16, 1934, an official statement from the Supreme Court closed the judicial path to take over churches.

The government had been talking with a Pontifical Commission, eager to forge a common position and consistently enforce them on the Orthodox Church. On April 23, 1932, the government resigned from discussions of the problem of the Eastern Catholic Church as too complex, but the Roman Catholic Church repeatedly returned to the subject. There were two approaches to solve the problem - an express agreement between the interested churches or the government's commitment to provide Catholics with those objects which they indicated as necessary. Meanwhile, the government sought to establish specific numbers in regard to the movement of Orthodox churches, Roman Catholic churches and Eastern Catholic churches by conducting further research as to their fates.

A separate project was presented by the government for monasteries. A document from February 1, 1936, announced the liquidation of the monastery of the Holy Trinity (Cerkiew Św. Trójcy i klasztor Bazylianów) in Vilnius, the merger of female monasteries in Vilnius and Berezwecz (buildings of the latter had been taken previously) and the closure of the Skete subordinate of the Pochayiv Lavra. Implementation of this was planned but did not take place.

== Recovery action and Polonization from 1937 to 1938 ==
=== Political Background ===
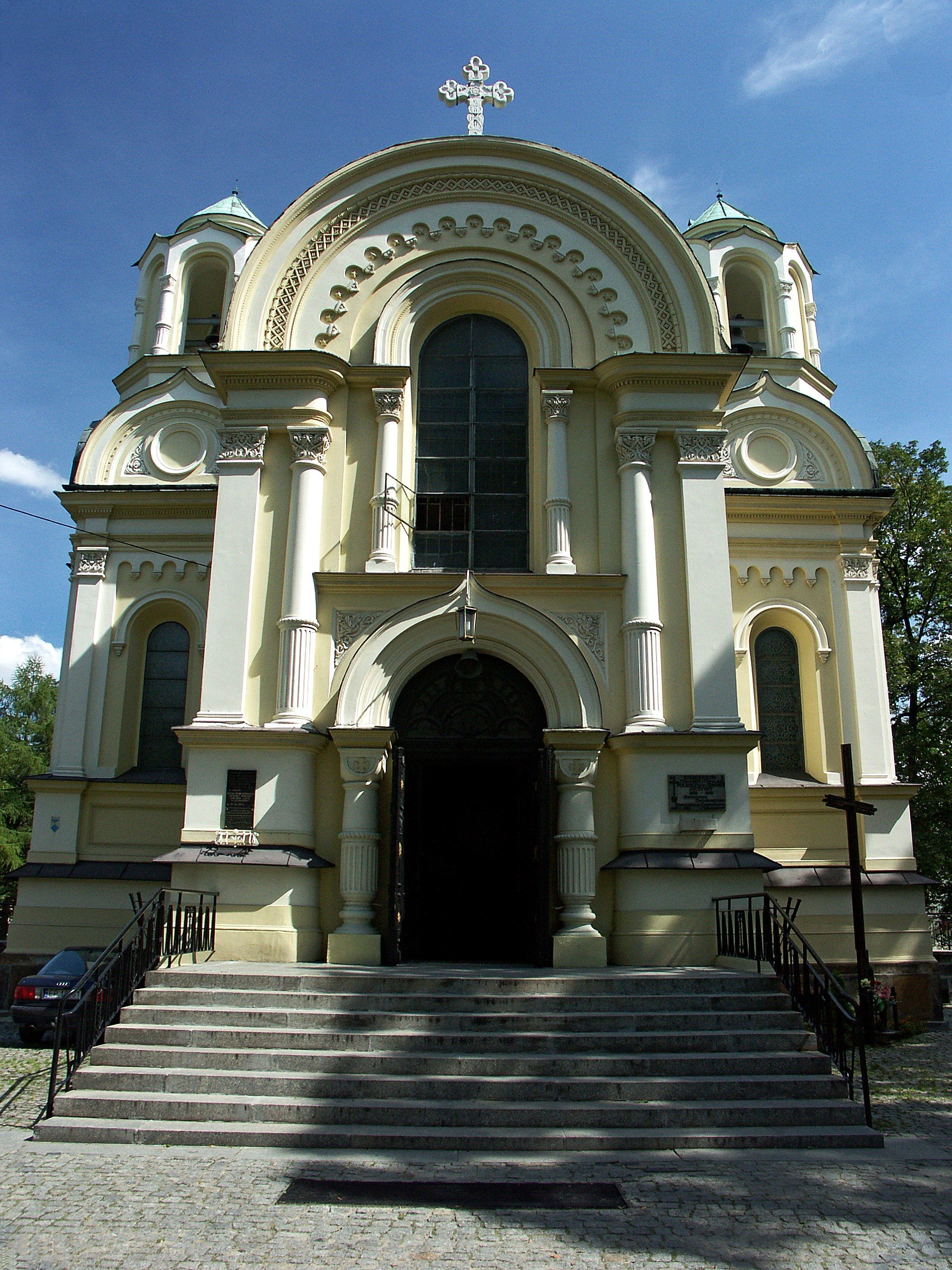
Church of St. James in Czestochowa, was an Orthodox Church named for Sts. Cyril and Methodius after tearing wooden church, and is now Catholic

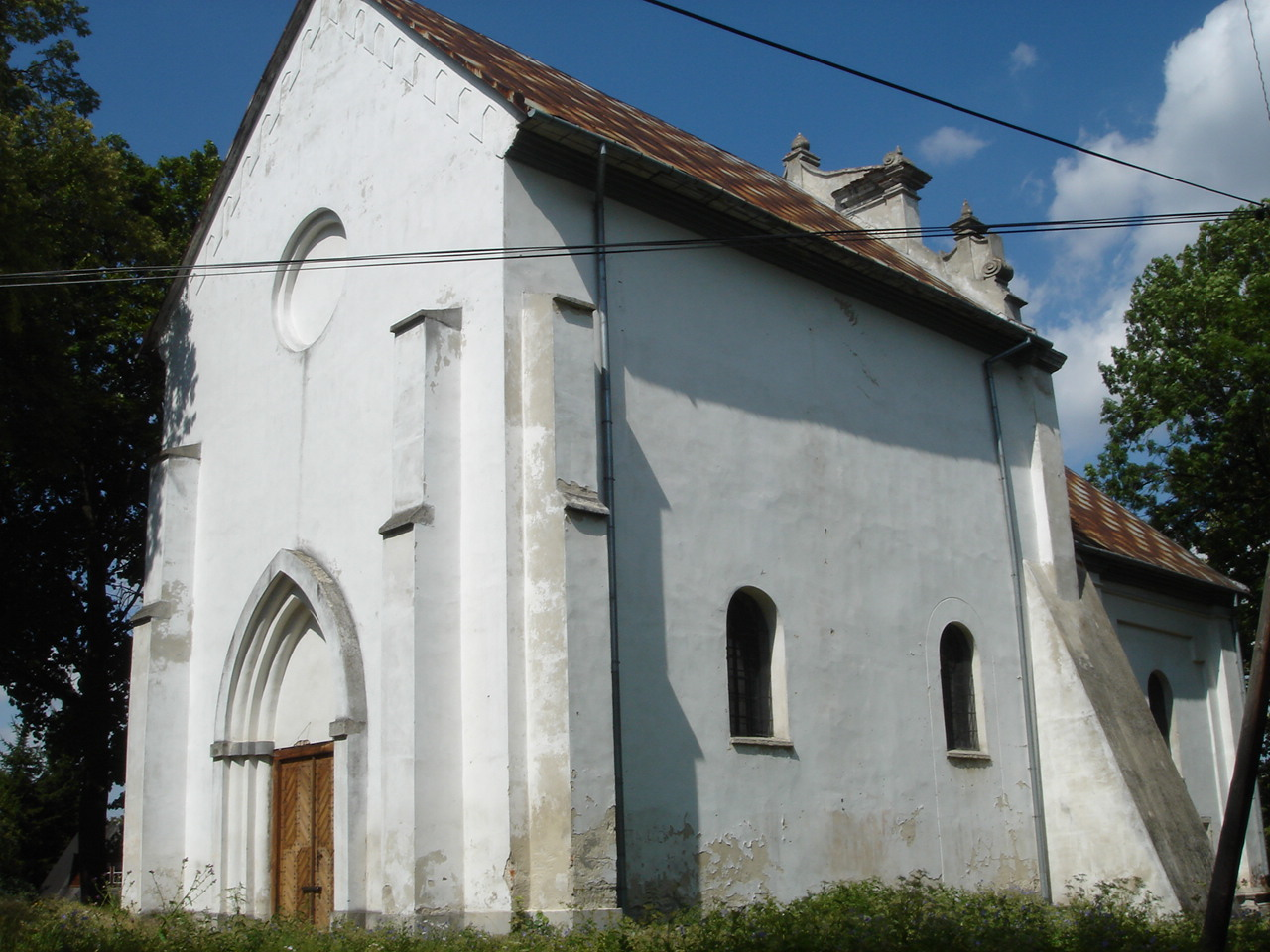
The Zaśnięcia Przenajświętszej Bogurodzicy Orthodox church in Szczebrzeszyn, was closed in 1918, and intended for demolition in 1938 but actions by the Orthodox faithful and local intelligentsia saved it. The property has been left without a roof and a devastated interior. The photograph shows the state after the first renovation

In the 1930s, the Polish government finally bowed to the assimilation of national minorities, thereby pre-empting the maximum Polonization of the Orthodox. Significant to this was the speech by the governor of Lublin, Józef Rożniecki, in 1935, for which the factor of the Russification of the Orthodox has become a potential tool of the Ukrainian national movement, and which, therefore, called for a decisive battle for its Polonization. In a speech on 31 January 1935: "The Role of the Church must correspond to the Polish state, the reason of state, and thus be a factor conducive to the spirit of the raison d'état, involve citizens in the first row of the Polish State, and for the Lublin region must be a factor of Polonization. We strive to Polonize Orthodoxy."

An important role was also played in military circles, demanding a more and more definitive solution to the problems of religious and civil Polonization in Chełm and Lublin, by force. In 1935, during a secret convention dedicated to the Ukrainian population, the Lublin civil administration openly carried on this conversation with the military, represented by General Mieczysław Smorawiński. The military demanded Polonization of the entire area between the Bug and Wieprz rivers to reduce the Ukrainian problem in these areas "to the role of small issues", comparable to the issue of Czech settlers or Germans in Volhynia in the district of Chełm. The convention concluded its findings in 35 points making up the program for further proceedings against the Ukrainian minority. Several of the points related to Orthodoxy, ordering its Polonization and preventing further expansion of its structures, including through the creation of non-permanent establishments.

After the death of Józef Piłsudski, these trends increased in strength, which was reflected in the establishment of the Minorities Committee, which at the first meeting addressed the issue of the Orthodox Church and upheld the concept of its Polonization, and eventually created the conditions to move the population to Roman Catholicism as the best guarantee of being Polish. According to a document prepared by the Coordinating Committee at the Headquarters Corps District No. II in Lublin, Orthodox Christians were to be divided into three categories: people close to the transition to Catholicism, people forcibly converted to Orthodoxy already associated with that faith, and nationally conscious Ukrainians and Orthodox. If you were attached to the Orthodox Church, but were also Polish, the document recommended careful Polonization, so as not to alienate the people with the demand of immediate conversion.

With regard to the conscious Ukrainians recommended while promoting the position that: "The Republic and the vast majority of its citizens refers to the construction of a Ukrainian State but outside the current borders of the Poland." In parallel was ordered: "The progress of this group of Ukrainians should by all possible means be hindered and ridiculed and to prevent the passage of influence of Eastern Galicia and Volhyn."

=== Demolition of the Orthodox churches in Chełm ===
The formal reason for the demolition of the Orthodox churches would be to remove many unnecessary objects built by the Tsarists which were symbols of Russification and more symbolic than practical. The actual reason, officially not invoked, was the struggle against the Ukrainian movement, as most of the symbols of the church had been destroyed or transferred directly to the Catholic Church after 1918. Particular attention was paid to the closed churches in towns where a significant percentage of the population were Orthodox and actively wanted them to be reopened. Unlike previous waves of the recovery, the government took care to create the right atmosphere, inspiring a series of newspaper articles in support of affirmative action claiming that Orthodox churches may cause re-Russification or Ukrainianization in places of mixed ethnic composition. At the same time the government officially, through Prime Minister Felicjan Sławoj Składkowski, declared a willingness to have prudent policy towards national minorities.

Demolition of the churches took place from May to July, 1938, with the demolitions performed by hired workers, prisoners, engineers or firemen. The Commander in Chief was General Bruno Olbrycht (replaced on May 21 by Colonel Marian Turkowski), and the new governor of Lublin, Major Jerzy Albin de Tramecourt, who was an overt supporter of Polonization. On January 20, 1938, Olbrycht provided detailed guidance: at a county level, guidance officers coming from local military units were to be appointed to head the field teams. Olbrycht also emphasized the importance of the ideological framing for the entire project, consistently emphasizing the validity of the Polonization actions. A special role was marked for the Society for the Development of Eastern Territories (Towarzystwu Rozwoju Ziem Wschodnich). In April of the same year, Olbrycht also presented a demand for the areas to be saturated with Roman Catholic priests.

There were commonly cases of destruction and desecration of religious objects. In most cases the local population, intimidated, made no attempt to stop this, and only watched the demolitions. Only in a few cases did the faithful risk beatings by the police or get into brawls with workers. Once in court, this usually ended with the defeat of the local population. The breakthrough was a judgment about 30 people from the village of Chmielek (where a church built in 1796 was destroyed) who were acquitted by the judge Stanisław Markowski. From this point on, investigations into people defending Orthodox property were redeemed.

During the demolition of churches actions were made without clear criteria. In protest, in parliament July 21, 1938, Polish-Ukrainian politician Stepan Baran listed the cases of dismantling of active monasteries and sites that had been places of worship for centuries. Only five demolished churches had been attended by fewer than 1,000 faithful. The authorities also closed a number of non-permanent establishments.

=== Reactions ===
While the Orthodox population made no attempt to actively resist, they more often protested through legal means, using the representatives of the Ukrainian minority in parliament, and through memorials and complaints directly to the government and the Marshal of the Sejm. The authors recounted the cases of church demolitions, and complained of acts of aggression on the part of some participants. The unambiguous attitude towards the government did not have much effect. President Mościcki only contacted Metropolitan Dionizy (Waledyński) at the beginning of April, 1938.

From June 30 to July 2 there was an extraordinary congress of Orthodox Church clergy in Chełm, and they wrote a memorandum addressed to the Speakers of both parliamentary chambers, the MRRiOP and the president, and then chose a delegation of lay people to hand it to the correct people. On July 6, the Metropolitan once again sent a telegram to the Prime Minister and the Speaker Edward Rydz-Śmigły, in which he asked for the destruction to stop. Ten days later, as actions to destroy churches continued, the Council of Bishops of the Polish Orthodox Church prepared another memorandum to the state authorities, who had been the recipients of the previous memorandum. They expressed deep sorrow about the government actions, solidarity with the people deprived of their Orthodox churches, and stated that they would not have thought that such a cruel and undeserved blow would fall on Christian churches in a Christian country, something which could be compared to what happened in Godless countries.

A separate pastoral letter, the call was made for a three-day fast on the first days of August, it appealed for people to refrain from revenge and expressing admiration towards those who refused to convert. This text was confiscated by the authorities and the clergy who had read it during services were punished.

Ukrainian politicians in parliament, Stepan Baran, Stepan Ivanovych Skrypnyk and Father Marcin Wołkow protested against the demolition of churches. The latter filed an application for the appointment of a committee of inquiry, which would examine the overall relationship between the Orthodox Church and the Polish government but the Speaker of Parliament said this was unconstitutional and did not put the proposal to a vote. Mr Baran in his speech, called for the cessation of pressure on Orthodox clergy on the use of the Polish language in preaching and teaching of religion, and called for the guarantee of freedom to profess the Orthodox faith. Ukrainian organizations protested, including those related to the Ukrainian Greek Catholic Church, with Metropolitan Archbishop Andrey Sheptytsky issuing a pastoral letter on the case. This also was confiscated by the Polish administration. Protests poured in from other Orthodox Churches in Ukraine and Russia. In July 1938, the latter group organized a demonstration of solidarity with the Polish Orthodox Christians in New York City and Winnipeg.

Leftist Polish newspapers strongly condemned the activities of the State and the Catholic Church, with the PPS's People's Daily stating that by forcing Roman Catholicism on people and fighting against Orthodoxy people missed was the chance of living with Polish national minorities. On the pages of the Vilnius newspaper "Słowo", they strongly criticized the actions in Podlasie and Chełm. Conservative columnist Stanisław Mackiewicz called the action a "cardinal mistake" and claiming that its authors should appear before a state tribunal. The official authorities of the Catholic Church, in spite of many accusations of them inspiring, or at least supporting, the destruction of the churches, did not reply to objections posed to them, and only after the action stated that it had no connection with it.

In terms of political success, the action failed to fulfil its tasks. The sense of danger, common in the Orthodox Church, had contributed to its consolidation and further strengthened the influence of the Ukrainian movement within it. There was a revival of nationalist sentiments among Ukrainians, strengthened contacts between representatives of the nationalities in Podlasie and Chełm and in Volhynia and Galicia. The Governor of Lublin even feared possible riots.

=== Results of the actions ===
The destruction of churches, unlike the previous recoveries of Orthodox properties, was brought to an end against the resistance of the faithful and the clergy. A report from the Governor of Lublin on July 16 indicated that at this point the authorities concluded there was no longer sufficient churches to deal with and started to mute the moods associated with the actions. The same document states that in the course of operations, 91 Orthodox churches, 26 prayer houses and 10 chapels were destroyed. In addition, four churches were adapted to be Roman Catholic churches, and one, dominated by the faithful who would not be removed from it, was later given to the Roman Catholic Church.

The Orthodox Church was left with practically the minimum necessary of surviving churches, with 20 churches built after 1918 also having been destroyed. Many monuments of culture were destroyed including a church in Szczebrzeszyn which dated from the 16th century, one in Biała Podlaska from 1582, and one in Zamość from 1589. This stopped thousands of the faithful from participating in Orthodox celebrations and some of them, against their will, had to formally adopt Catholicism or begin to participate in the rites celebrated in Roman Catholic churches. In 1938, the Orthodox Church lost a third of all their churches.

=== Actions in Volyn ===
In December 1937, contrary to the opinion of the regional governor Henryk Józewski, the action of forced conversion of local communities to Roman Catholicism in the Volyn region was launched, justified by the need to return Polish people "Russified" from the era of the partitions. The first settlement where the action was performed, was Hryńki, where a branch of the Border Protection Corps (Korpusu Ochrony Pogranicza), after insulting the villagers portraits of dignitaries of state, received documents from 40 peasants, forbade residents from leaving Hryńki after sunset and surrounded the village. The end result of these actions was the passage from Orthodoxy to Catholicism of 572 peasants. Similar methods in the Volyn region continued until 1939 effecting ten thousand people. The Government consistently argued that all converts voluntarily changed their religion. The Ukrainian Orthodox Church maintained, however, that the majority of converts to Catholicism did so under the influence of blackmail and coercion, or because of conflicts with local Orthodox clergy. It is now known that those in charge of conversion made promises to give land to the peasants after changing to Catholicism, and argued that their ancestors belonged to the Catholic nobility, but they also used arrest and intimidation to convert those of Orthodox faith.

Roman Catholic clergy actively participated in conversions to Catholicism, directly promoting their religion among the population and steadily expanding networks of parishes. Some parishes were established at the same time in areas where only small groups of Catholics lived, or did not have any faithful at all, especially on greenfield sites. The only strong existing rural centres of Catholicism in the Volyn region were in Huta, Kuty, Wyrka, and Zasmyki.

== Further Polonization actions up to mid-1939 ==
Despite the completion of the emergency demolition of the churches, the administration continued steps to Polonize the Orthodox Church and reduce its influence. They were particularly active encouraging the Polish language to be used in sermons and pastor's informal contacts with the faithful in place of Ukrainian or Belarusian. The administration of the province of Lublin, despite a duty for governors to detail progress on Polonization, found that pushing the Polish language into churches was encountering serious difficulties, since the majority of the clergy and the Orthodox faithful clearly identified with Ukrainian, Belarusian or Russian nationalities and spoke one of those three languages.

In the first half of 1939 activities to promote the transition to Catholicism continued, but also the effects didn't go as well as planned. New guidelines for the continuation of Polonization activities argued for the dismissal of administrative positions of non-Polish origin, strict control of the Orthodox clergy, and actively supporting the development of Roman Catholic structures in areas populated by the Orthodox. The head of the conversion activities, Colonel Marian Turkowski, openly emphasized that the purpose of the activities was to confirm that "only Poles in Poland are full citizens and only they have something to say in Poland".

== Unrealized action for restitution and Polonization ==
On February 23, 1939, the Lublin Provincial Office organized another conference, during which the representatives of the government, the army and local administration discussed policies on nationalities and religions. Governor Jerzy de Tramecourt declared the need to further increase Polish state ownership in the Lublin region by creating a nobility and settlement program, designed to break established historical clusters of Ukrainians. Ultimately, the region of Lublin and Chełm would be thoroughly cleansed of the Orthodox population and the population who strongly identifying with Ukrainian nationality. These actions were planned for the end of 1941 but were not implemented due to the outbreak of World War II.

== The problem of cemeteries ==
The issue of membership of a church was related to the problem of cemeteries, especially those operating at idle or closed churches and Eastern Catholic cemeteries then used by the Orthodox Church. As in the case of churches, until 1938 there lacked a clear and lasting legal solution, and the key role was played by regional authorities. The MWRiOP, not wanting to provoke further conflict, was of the opinion that the cemeteries at recovered churches be made available to the Orthodox, even though they were now Catholic. Despite this, there were cases where local authorities did not respect this order and refused access to Orthodox cemeteries. The final solution adopted by the President of the Second Republic allowed the possibility of creating Orthodox cemeteries.

== Bibliography ==
- M. Papierzyńska-Turek, Między tradycją a rzeczywistością. Państwo wobec prawosławia 1918–1939, Państwowy Instytut Wydawniczy, Warszawa 1989
- A. Mironowicz, Kościół prawosławny na ziemiach polskich w XIX i XX wieku, Wydawnictwo Uniwersytetu w Białymstoku, Białystok 2005, ISBN 83-7431-046-4
- K. Fotijew, A. Switicz, Православная церковь на Украине и в Польше в XX столетии 1917-1950 гг., Moskwa 1997, ISBN 5-7873-0006-8
- G. Kuprianowicz, Akcja burzenia cerkwi prawosławnych na Chełmszczyźnie i południowym Podlasiu, Prawosławna Diecezja Lubelsko-Chełmska, Chełm 2008, ISBN 978-83-925910-6-1, ISBN 978-83-927941-1-0, ISBN 978-83-60255-40-7 oraz jej wersja internetowa
- Robert Potocki, Polityka państwa polskiego wobec zagadnienia ukraińskiego w latach 1930-1939, Lublin 2003, wyd. Instytut Europy Środkowo-Wschodniej, ISBN 83-917615-4-1;
- A. Kinasz, Proces likwidacji prawosławnych cerkwi na Lubelszczyźnie w latach 1937-1938 w świetle relacji świadków w: Studia Sandomierskie, Red. Bogdan Stanaszek, Sandomierz 2010 ISSN 0208-7626
- Akcja burzenia cerkwi prawosławnych na Chełmszczyźnie i południowym Podlasiu
