= Filipowice =

Filipowice may refer to the following places:

- Filipowice, Kraków County in Lesser Poland Voivodeship (south Poland)
- Filipowice, Proszowice County in Lesser Poland Voivodeship (south Poland)
- Filipowice, Tarnów County in Lesser Poland Voivodeship (south Poland)
