= Koszyce, Lesser Poland Voivodeship =

Koszyce
- Town
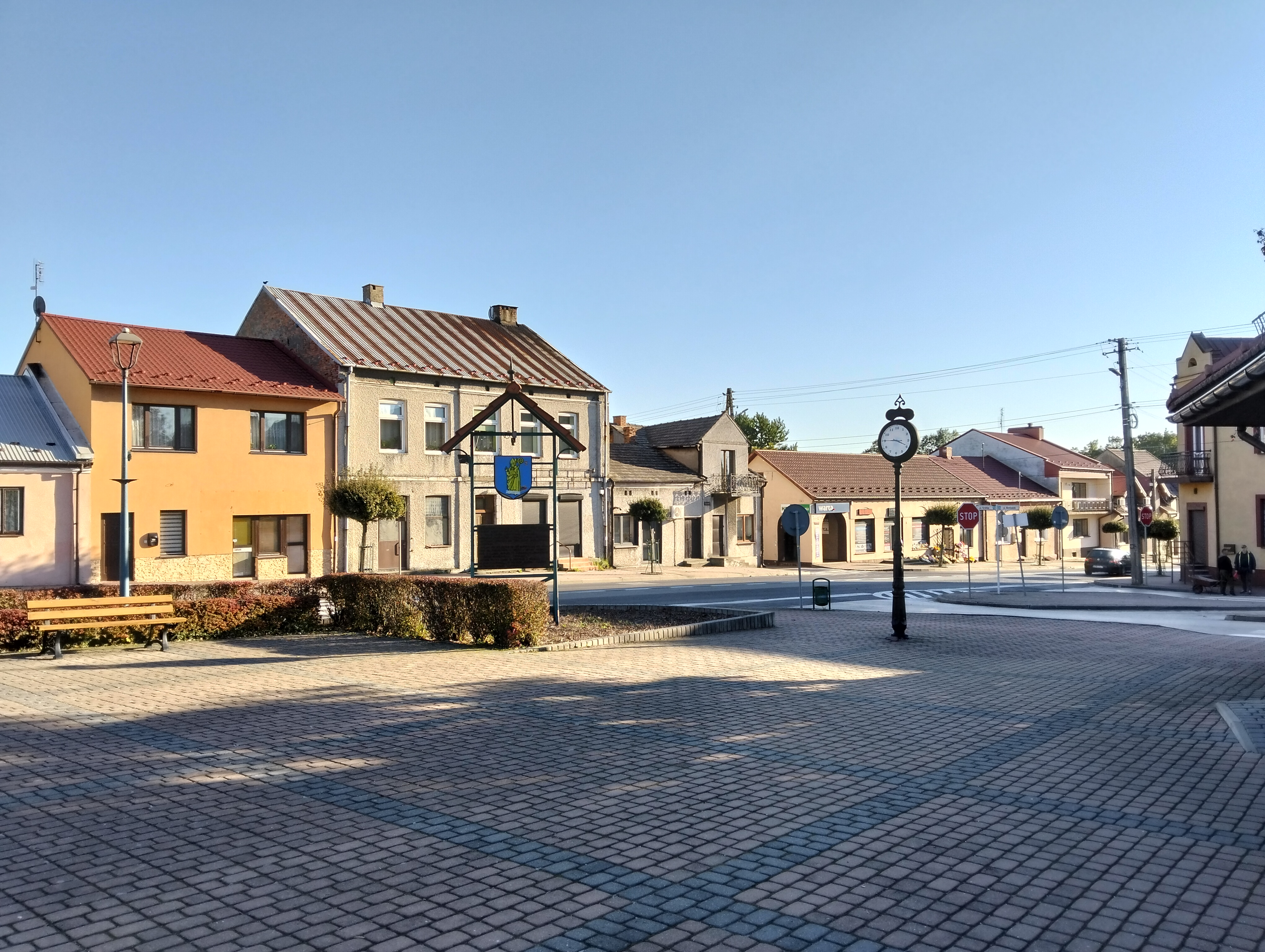
- Town center

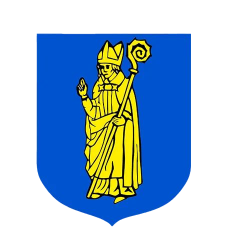
- Flag Coat of arms

- Location within Poland
- Coordinates: 50°10′13″N 20°34′23″E
- Country: Poland
- Voivodeship: Lesser Poland
- County: Proszowice
- Gmina: Koszyce
- Town rights: 1374

Population
  - Total: 769
- Time zone: UTC+1 (CET)
  - Summer (DST): UTC+2 (CEST)
- Vehicle registration: KPR

Koszyce [kɔˈʂɨt͡sɛ] is a town in Proszowice County, Lesser Poland Voivodeship, in southern Poland. It is the seat of the gmina (administrative district) called Gmina Koszyce.

== History ==
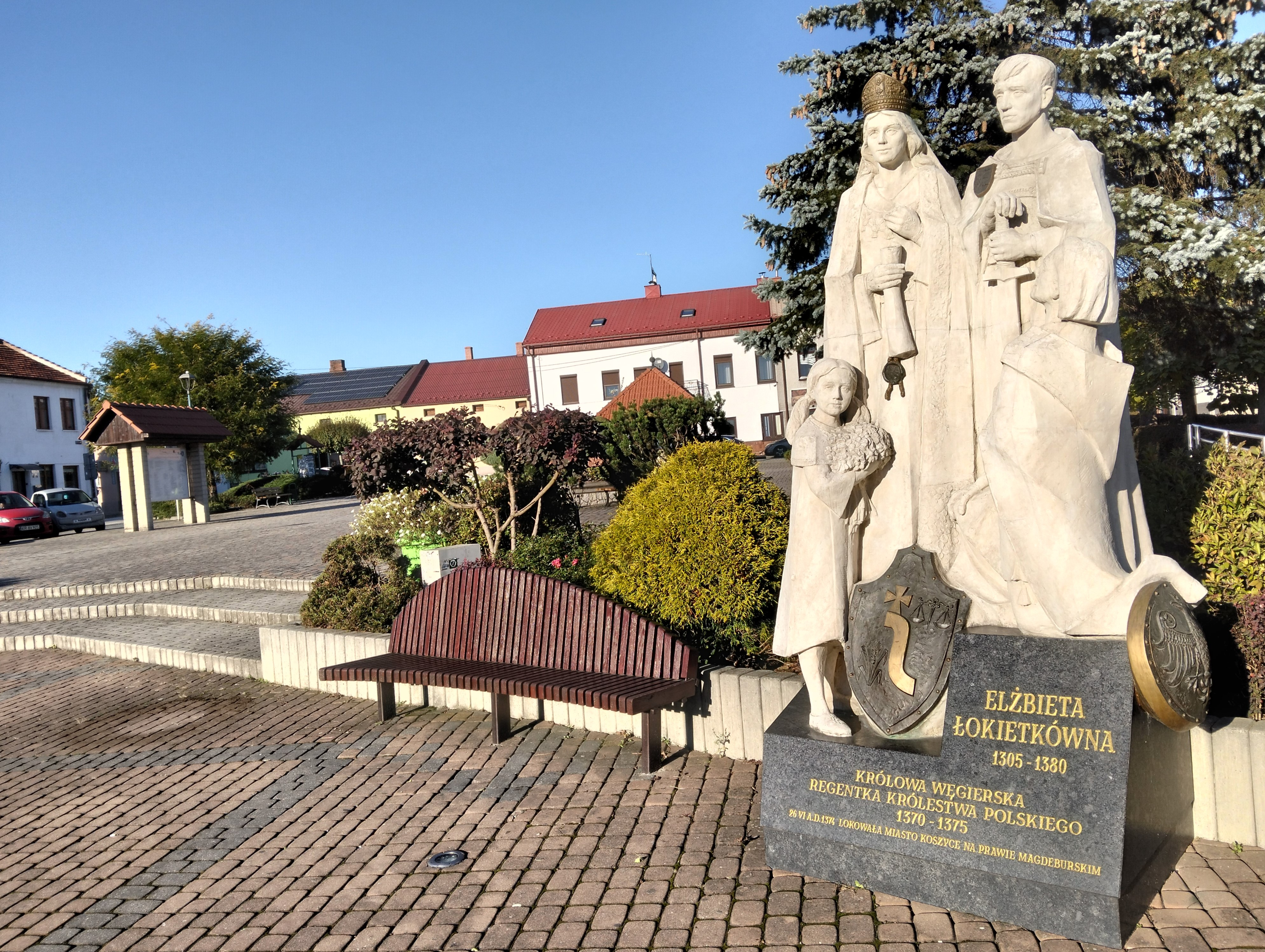
Monument of Elizabeth of Poland

The history of Koszyce dates back to the year 1328, when the village was for the first time mentioned in documents. On June 26, 1374, Elizabeth of Poland granted Magdeburg rights to Koszyce. There are undocumented speculations that Koszyce had received town charter before that date, and Queen Elizabeth only confirmed this fact. The town became a royal property, and was granted the right to organize weekly fairs on Mondays. On April 4, 1421, Koszyce's privileges were confirmed by King Wladyslaw Jagiello, probably because the 1374 document had been lost. The town prospered in the 15th century, due to a location along an important merchant trail from Kraków to Sandomierz. Furthermore, at the nearby village of Morsko was a busy Vistula river port.

At that time, Koszyce had its coat of arms, a rectangular market square and a town hall. It also had a suburb called Jawiczowice. First mention of Koszyce's parish church comes from mid-15th century. The town was governed by a wojt, together with a council. In the mid-17th century, there were app. 70 artisans at Koszyce. The town had a Holy Cross hospital and a parish school, and among its most famous residents was a physician named Jakub Grzywna, who moved to Koszyce from Kraków in 1520, and died here in 1531.

The decline of Koszyce was marked by the catastrophic Swedish invasion of Poland, when it was ransacked and burned by the Swedish and Transilvanian invaders. After the Partitions of Poland, Koszyce was annexed by the Habsburg Empire. After the Polish victory in the Austro-Polish War of 1809, it became part of the short-lived Duchy of Warsaw, and after the duchy's dissolution in 1815, it passed to Russian-controlled Congress Poland. During the January Uprising, Koszyce was one of the most important centers of the rebellion, and as a reprisal, the town was stripped of its charter on June 1, 1869. Following World War I, in 1918, Poland regaind independence and control of Koszyce.

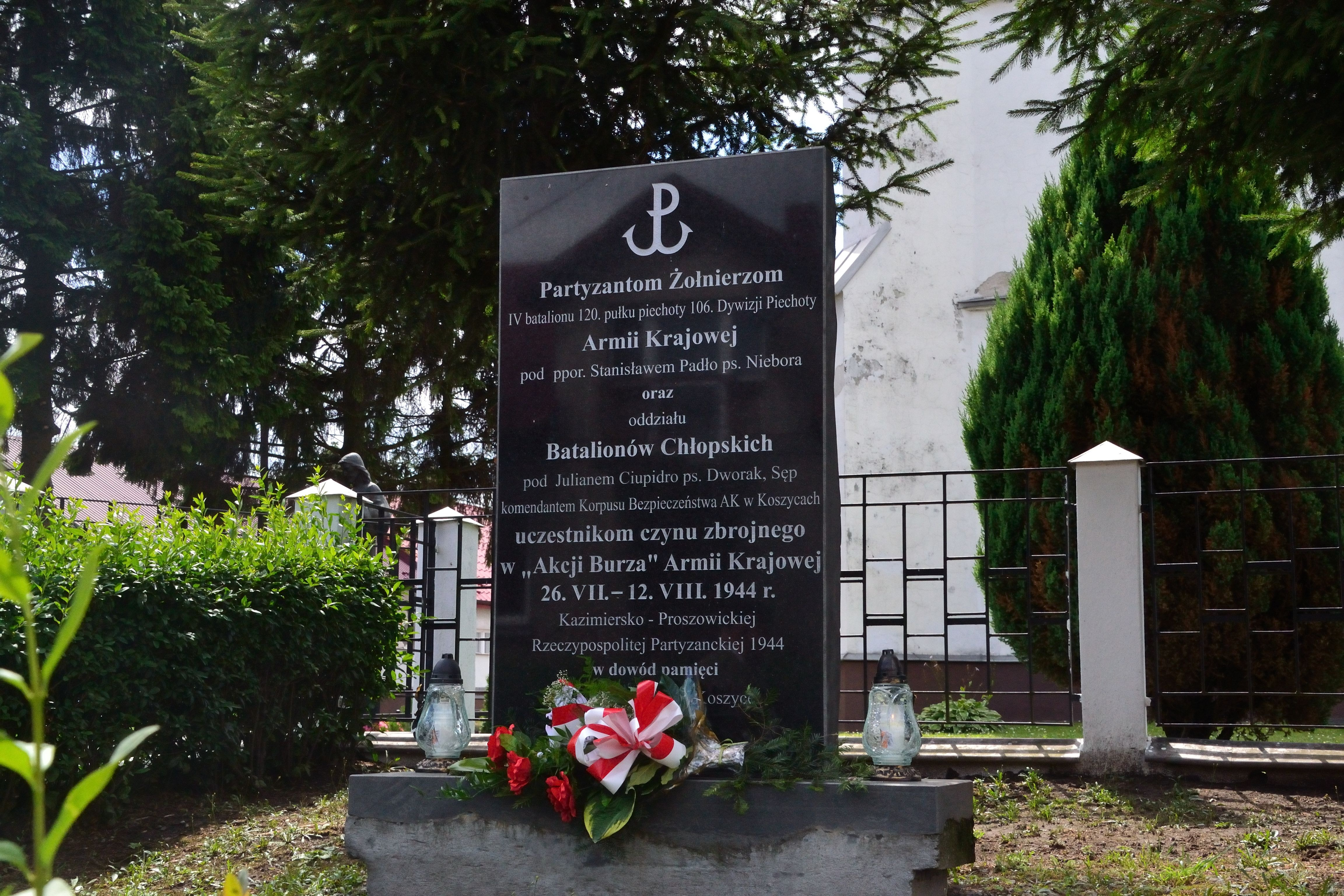
Monument to Home Army partisans

During the German-Soviet invasion of Poland at the start of World War II in September 1939, Koszyce was occupied by Germany until 1945. The Polish resistance movement was active in the town, including a local unit of the Home Army under the cryptonym "Komin" ("Chimney"). On 26 July 1944, the town was liberated by Polish partisans of the Home Army, and then formed part of the short-lived Polish "Kazimierza-Proszowice Partisan Republic".
