= Malkowitz =

Malkowitz may refer to:

- German name of Małkowice, Opole Voivodeship
- Bohaté Málkovice (since 1923: Německé Malkovice, German: Deutsch Malkowitz), a village and municipality (obec) in Vyškov District in the South Moravian Region of the Czech Republic
- Moravské Málkovice (German: Mährisch Malkowitz, Malkowitz), a village and municipality (obec) in Vyškov District in the South Moravian Region of the Czech Republic

== See also ==
- Malkovich
- Malkwitz
