= Dissolution of monasteries under the Russian Partition =

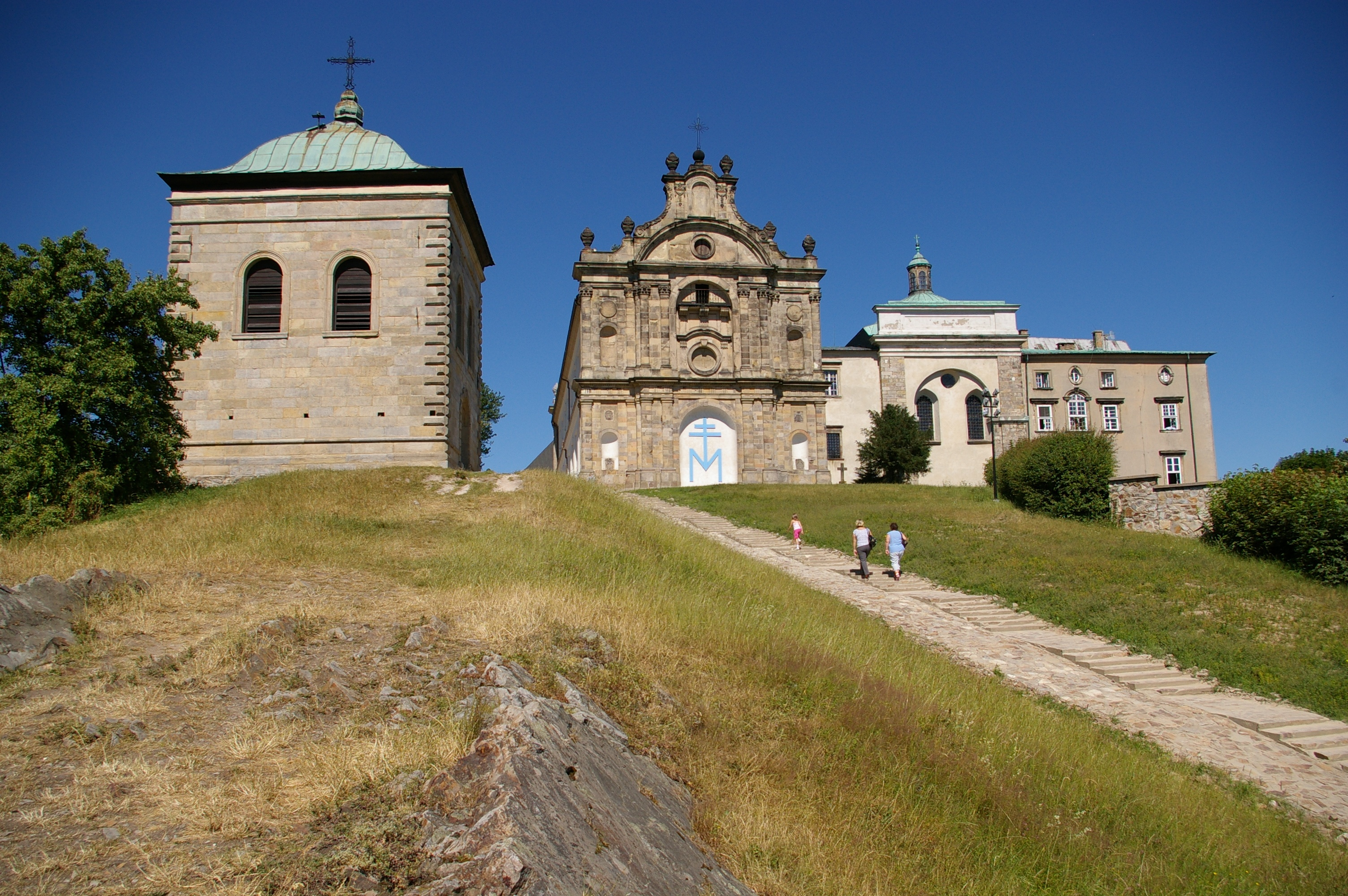
Benedictine Abbacy in Święty Krzyż, dissolved in 1819

Dissolution of monasteries under the Russian Partition and Congress Poland - the dissolution of Catholic monasteries carried out in the nineteenth century by Russian authorities and Catholic authorities in Congress Poland and the Taken Lands.

== Dissolution of monasteries in Congress Poland (1819) ==
In 1819, Pope Pius VII introduced a new bull, the Ex imposita Nobis, introducing a new division of dioceses in the Kingdom of Poland. The creator of the Papal bull was Primate Franciszek Skarbek-Malczewski, whom the Pope authorised to dissolve several collegiate churches as to financially secure the remaining bishoprics and upkeep the newly formed Roman Catholic Diocese of Sandomierz and Janów Podlaski.

The main designers of the dissolution were two Polishmen, the politician Stanisław Kostka Potocki and the Catholic priest Stanisław Staszic. Potocki established to dissolve 30 male and 8 female monasteries. Bishop Malczewski was against such widespread dissolution. Pressured by Potocki, Bishop Szczepan Hołowczyc, Antoni Melchior Fijałkowski, Antoni Kotowski, likely nescient, had signed the dissolution order on April 17, 1819. By virtue of the decree, the inter alia following abbacies were dissolved: Sulejów Abbey, Wąchock Abbey, Święty Krzyż Basilica, the Norbertine monasteries in Witów and Hebdów, the Order of the Holy Sepulchre monastery of Miechów and the Camaldolese monastery in Szaniec. On August 16, 1822, the Namiestnik of Poland followed a decree to seize all material property from the dissolved properties to a common religious fund.
