= Sokołowice, Lesser Poland Voivodeship =

Sokołowice
- Village
- Location within Poland
- Coordinates: 50°10′N 20°35′E
- Country: Poland
- Voivodeship: Lesser Poland
- County: Proszowice
- Gmina: Koszyce

Sokołowice [sɔkɔwɔˈvit͡sɛ] is a village in the administrative district of Gmina Koszyce, within Proszowice County, Lesser Poland Voivodeship, in southern Poland.
