= Zagaje, Proszowice County =

Zagaje
- Village
- Location within Poland
- Coordinates: 50°9′10″N 20°30′30″E
- Country: Poland
- Voivodeship: Lesser Poland
- County: Proszowice
- Gmina: Koszyce

Zagaje [zaˈɡajɛ] is a village in the administrative district of Gmina Koszyce, within Proszowice County, Lesser Poland Voivodeship, in southern Poland.
