= Modrzany =

- Village
- Location within Poland
- Coordinates: 50°10′3″N 20°29′7″E
- Country: Poland
- Voivodeship: Lesser Poland
- County: Proszowice
- Gmina: Koszyce

Modrzany (Polish pronunciation: [mɔdˈʐanɨ]) is a village in the administrative district of Gmina Koszyce, within Proszowice County, Lesser Poland Voivodeship, in southern Poland.
