= Gmina Koszyce =

Gmina Koszyce Koszyce Commune
- Gmina
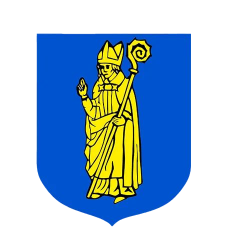
- Flag Coat of arms
- Interactive map of Gmina Koszyce
- Coordinates (Koszyce): 50°10′13″N 20°34′23″E
- Country: Poland
- Voivodeship: Lesser Poland
- County: Proszowice
- Seat: Koszyce

Area
  - Total: 65.96 km^{2} (25.47 sq mi)

Population (2006)
  - Total: 5,649
  - Density: 85.64/km^{2} (221.8/sq mi)
- Website: http://www.koszyce.gmina.pl/

Gmina Koszyce is a rural gmina (administrative district) in Proszowice County, Lesser Poland Voivodeship, in southern Poland. Its seat is the village of Koszyce, which lies approximately 20 kilometres (12 mi) east of Proszowice and 47 km (29 mi) east of the regional capital Kraków.

The gmina covers an area of 65.96 square kilometres (25.5 sq mi), and as of 2006 its total population is 5,649.

== Villages ==
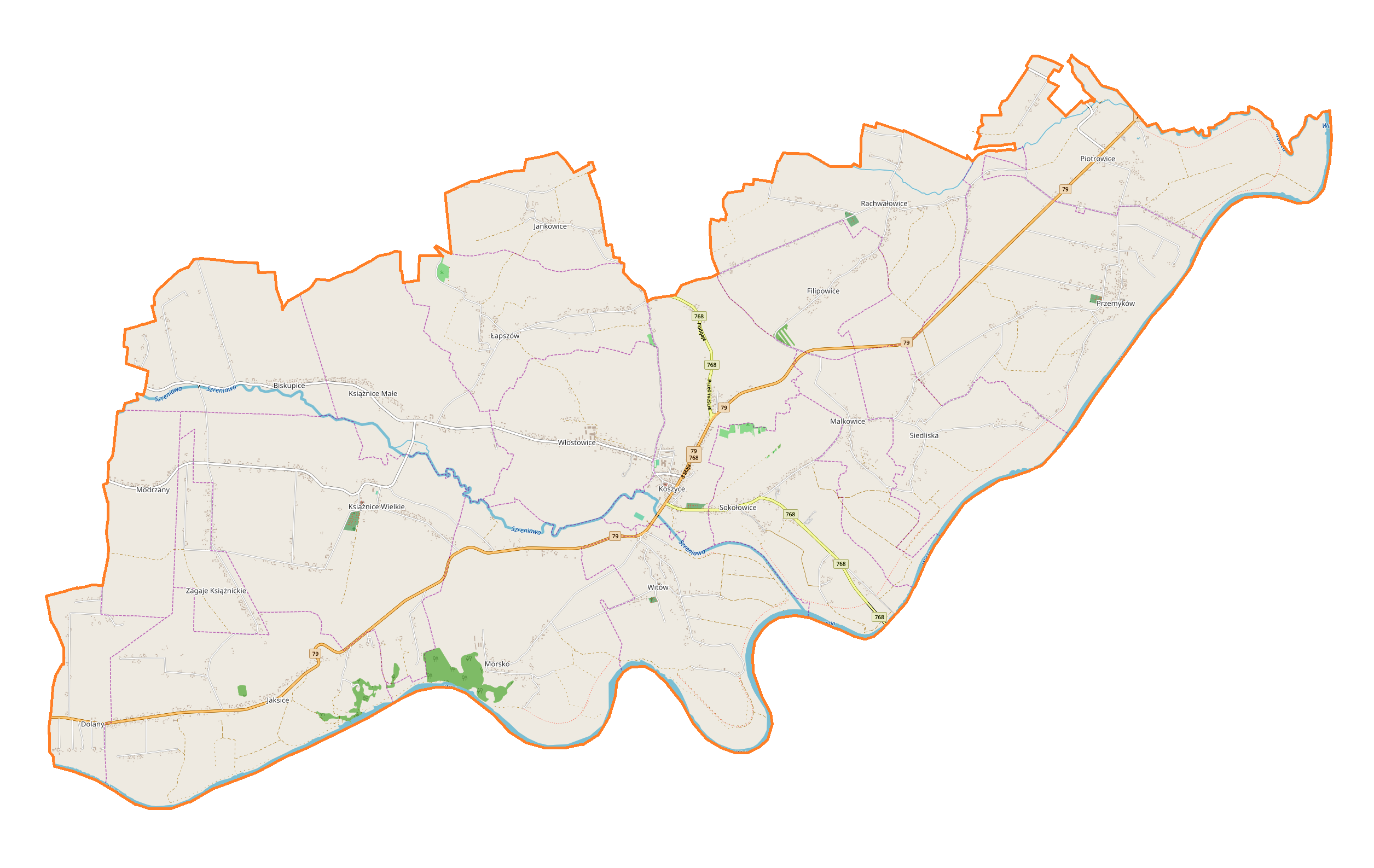
Koszyce map

Gmina Koszyce contains the villages and settlements of Biskupice, Dolany, Filipowice, Jaksice, Jankowice, Koszyce, Książnice Małe, Książnice Wielkie, Łapszów, Malkowice, Modrzany, Morsko, Piotrowice, Przemyków, Rachwałowice, Siedliska, Sokołowice, Witów, Włostowice and Zagaje.

== Neighbouring gminas ==
Gmina Koszyce is bordered by the gminas of Bejsce, Drwinia, Kazimierza Wielka, Nowe Brzesko, Opatowiec, Proszowice, Szczurowa and Wietrzychowice.
