= Książnice Małe =

- Village
- Location within Poland
- Coordinates: 50°11′N 20°32′E
- Country: Poland
- Voivodeship: Lesser Poland
- County: Proszowice
- Gmina: Koszyce

Książnice Małe [kɕɔ̃ʐˈnit͡sɛ ˈmawɛ] is a village in the administrative district of Gmina Koszyce, within Proszowice County, Lesser Poland Voivodeship, in southern Poland.
