= Siedliska, Gmina Koszyce =

Siedliska
- Village
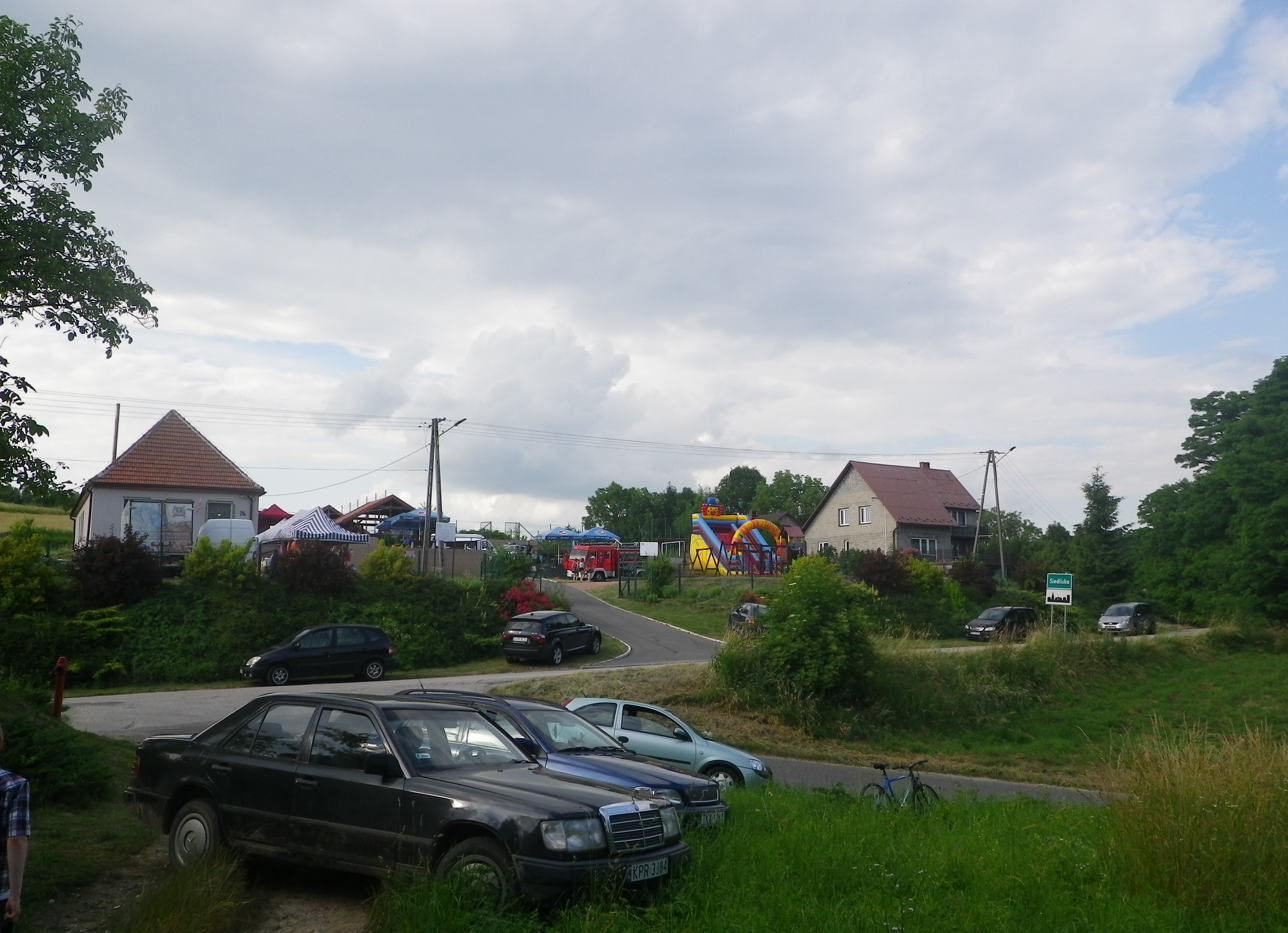

- Location within Poland
- Coordinates: 50°10′20″N 20°36′59″E
- Country: Poland
- Voivodeship: Lesser Poland
- County: Proszowice
- Gmina: Koszyce

Siedliska [ɕɛdˈlʲiska] is a village in the administrative district of Gmina Koszyce, within Proszowice County, Lesser Poland Voivodeship, in southern Poland.
