= Książnice Wielkie =

- Village
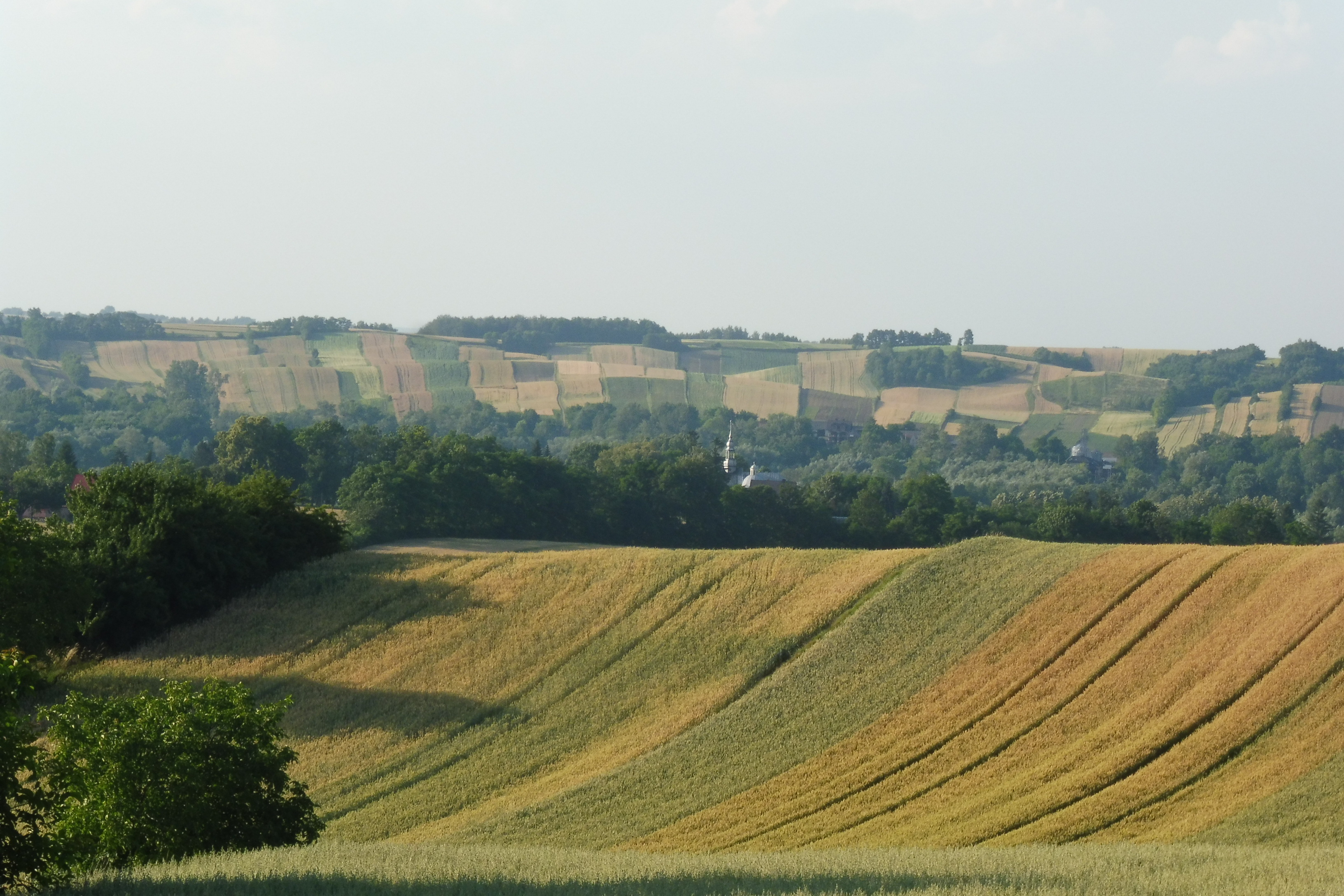

- Location within Poland
- Coordinates: 50°9′N 20°31′E
- Country: Poland
- Voivodeship: Lesser Poland
- County: Proszowice
- Gmina: Koszyce
- Population: 520

Książnice Wielkie [kɕɔ̃ʐˈnit͡sɛ ˈvjɛlkʲɛ] is a village in the administrative district of Gmina Koszyce, within Proszowice County, Lesser Poland Voivodeship, in southern Poland.
