= Biskupice, Proszowice County =

Biskupice
- Village
- Location within Poland
- Coordinates: 50°10′39″N 20°30′47″E
- Country: Poland
- Voivodeship: Lesser Poland
- County: Proszowice
- Gmina: Koszyce

Biskupice [biskuˈpit͡sɛ] is a village in the administrative district of Gmina Koszyce, within Proszowice County, Lesser Poland Voivodeship, in southern Poland.
