= Przemyków =

- Village
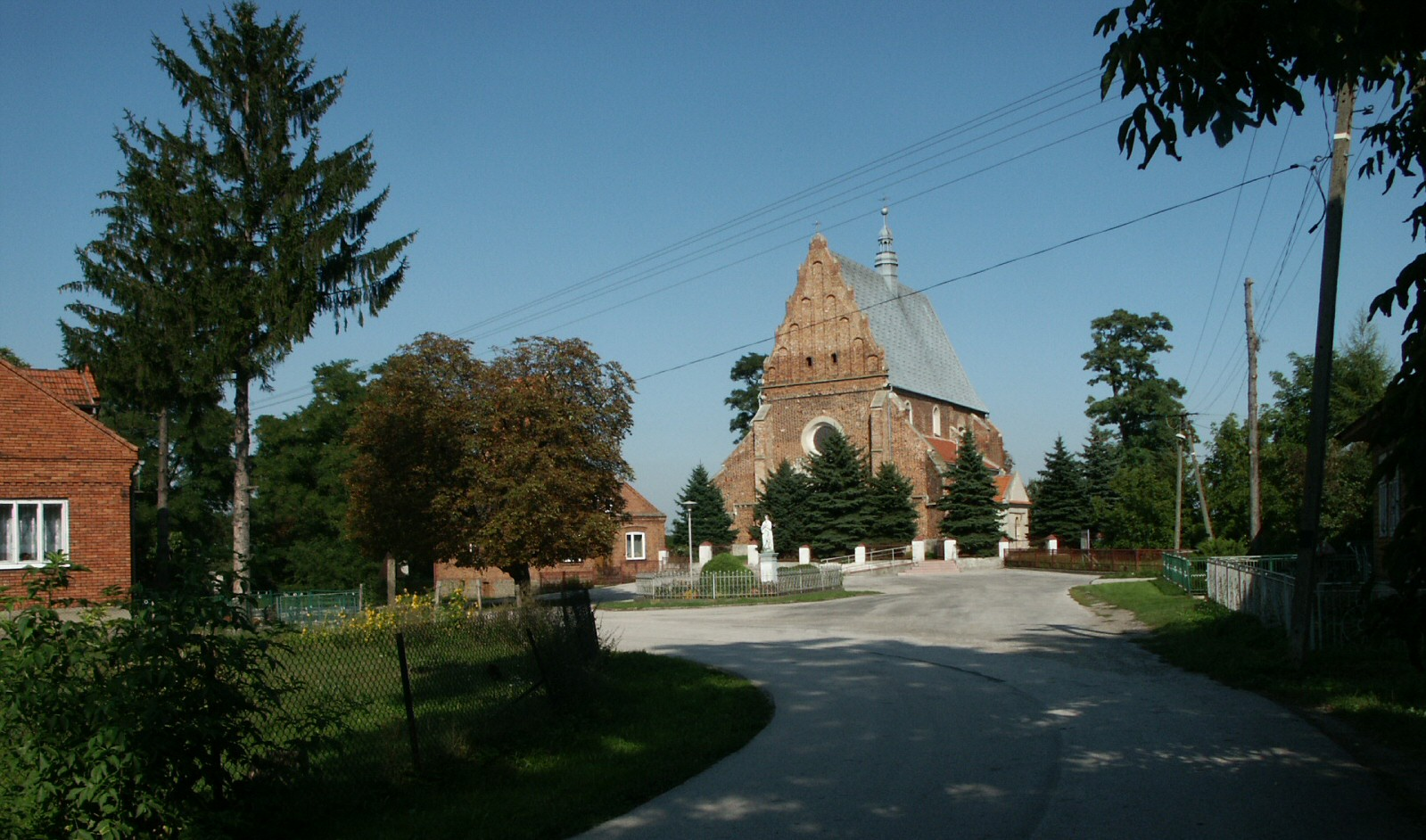

- Location within Poland
- Coordinates: 50°11′N 20°39′E
- Country: Poland
- Voivodeship: Lesser Poland
- County: Proszowice
- Gmina: Koszyce
- Population: 499

Przemyków [pʂɛˈmɨkuf] is a village in the administrative district of Gmina Koszyce, within Proszowice County, Lesser Poland Voivodeship, in southern Poland. This area consists mainly of farmland and neighborhoods. Located at Przemyków 66, 32-130 Przemyków, Poland is the village church Św Katarzyny Męczennicy (Saint Katherine Martyrs). The village is located just off of the Wisła River (also known as Vistula River) making it a very useful and easily accessible resource for the village. The village also consists of a fire station, cemetery, and convenience store for everyday needs. The village has a population of 499. Being a small village, it is a place where everyone knows everyone. It consists of many generations of the same families such as the Kulesza's, Marek's, Noga's, and the Ciesla's.
