= Jaksice, Proszowice County =

Jaksice
- Village
- Location within Poland
- Coordinates: 50°08′44″N 20°30′41″E
- Country: Poland
- Voivodeship: Lesser Poland
- County: Proszowice
- Gmina: Koszyce

Jaksice [jakˈɕit͡sɛ] is a village in the administrative district of Gmina Koszyce, within Proszowice County, Lesser Poland Voivodeship, in southern Poland.
