= Jankowice, Proszowice County =

Jankowice
- Village
- Location within Poland
- Coordinates: 50°11′41″N 20°33′15″E
- Country: Poland
- Voivodeship: Lesser Poland
- County: Proszowice
- Gmina: Koszyce

Jankowice [jankɔˈvit͡sɛ] is a village in the administrative district of Gmina Koszyce, within Proszowice County, Lesser Poland Voivodeship, in southern Poland.
