= Doljani =

Doljani may refer to several places:

== Bosnia and Herzegovina ==
- Doljani, Bihać, a village in the Bihać municipality
- Doljani, Čapljina, a village in the Čapljina municipality
- Doljani, Hadžići, a village in the Hadžići municipality
- Doljani, Jablanica, a village in the Jablanica municipality
- Doljani, Konjic, a village in the Konjic municipality

== Croatia ==
- Doljani, Bjelovar-Bilogora County, a village in the Daruvar municipality
- Doljani, Donji Lapac, a village in the Donji Lapac municipality of Lika-Senj County
- Doljani, Otočac, a village in the Otočac municipality of Lika-Senj County
- Doljani Žumberački, a village in the Ozalj municipality

== Montenegro ==
- Doljani, Montenegro, a village in the Podgorica municipality

== Serbia ==
- Doljani (Novi Pazar), a village near Novi Pazar
- Doljani, Ostružnica, an abandoned village near Čukarica, Belgrade
