= Piotrowice, Proszowice County =

Piotrowice
- Village
- Location within Poland
- Coordinates: 50°12′03″N 20°38′38″E
- Country: Poland
- Voivodeship: Lesser Poland
- County: Proszowice
- Gmina: Koszyce

Piotrowice [pjɔtrɔˈvit͡sɛ] is a village in the administrative district of Gmina Koszyce, within Proszowice County, Lesser Poland Voivodeship, in southern Poland.
