= Dolany (Plzeň-North District) =

- Municipality
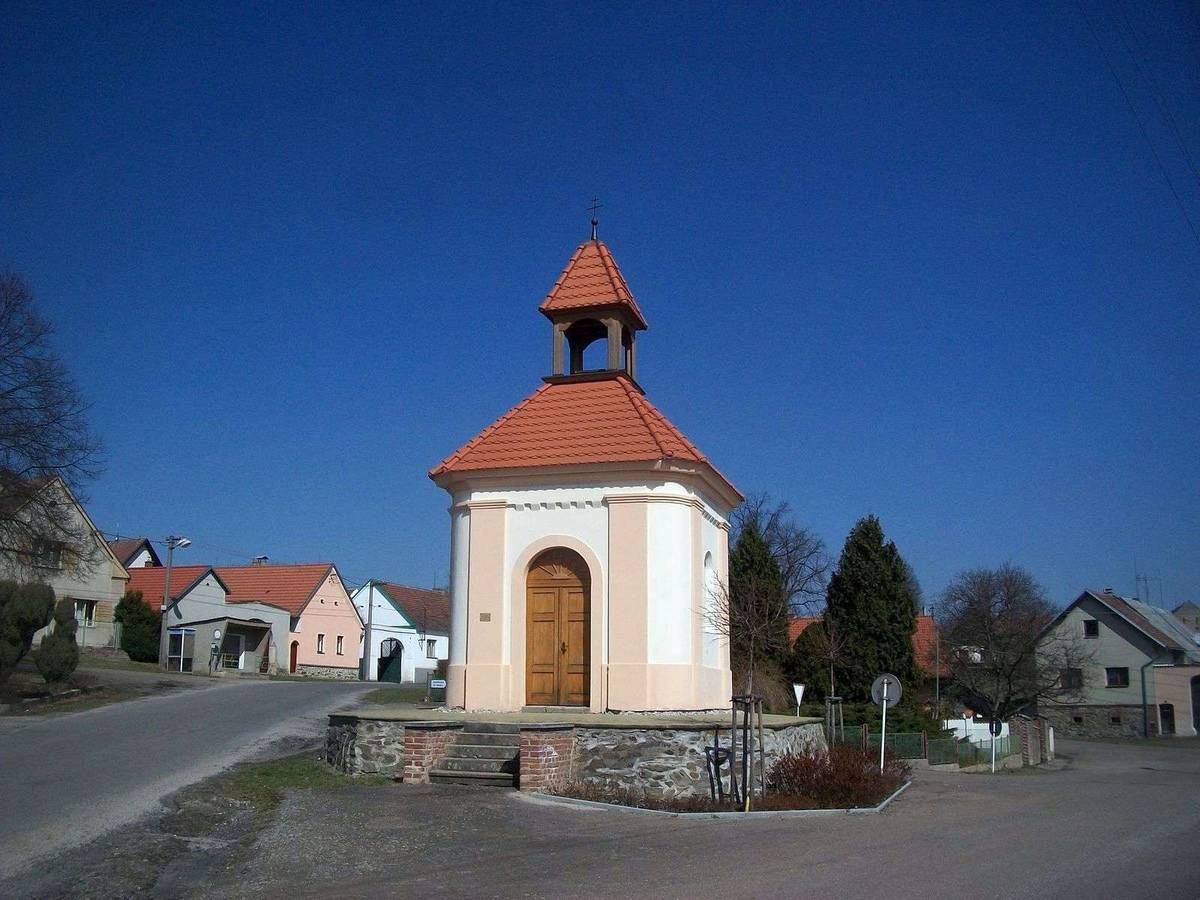
- Chapel of Saint Anne

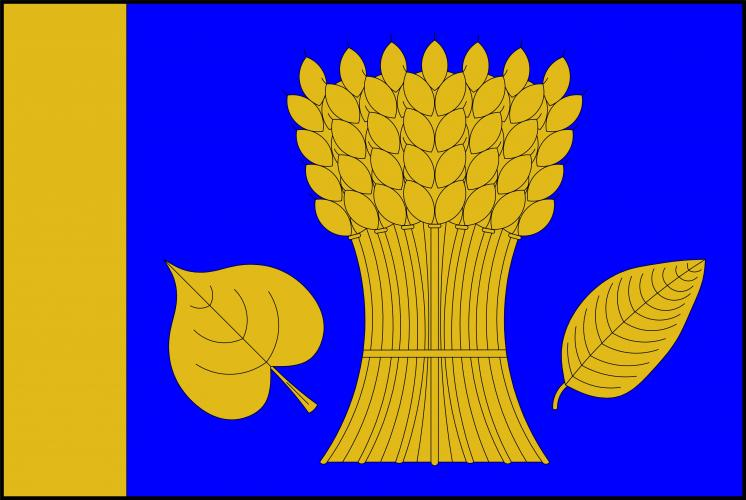
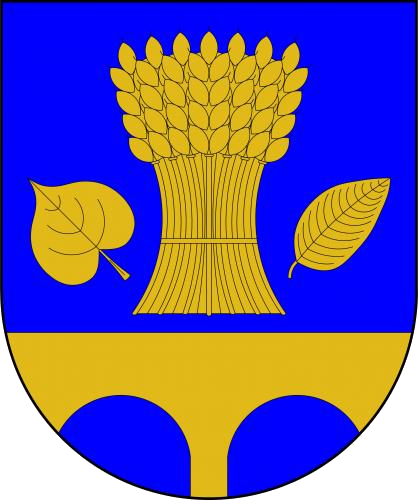
- Flag Coat of arms

- Location in the Czech Republic
- Coordinates: 49°48′28″N 13°28′21″E
- Country: Czech Republic
- Region: Plzeň
- District: Plzeň-North
- First mentioned: 1266

Area
  - Total: 8.14 km^{2} (3.14 sq mi)
- Elevation: 340 m (1,120 ft)

Population (2026-01-01)
  - Total: 288
  - Density: 35.4/km^{2} (91.6/sq mi)
- Time zone: UTC+1 (CET)
  - Summer (DST): UTC+2 (CEST)
- Postal code: 330 11
- Website: www.dolany-ps.cz

Dolany is a municipality and village in Plzeň-North District in the Plzeň Region of the Czech Republic. It has about 300 inhabitants.

Dolany lies approximately 10 kilometres (6 mi) north-east of Plzeň and 75 km (47 mi) south-west of Prague.

== Administrative division ==
Dolany consists of two municipal parts (in brackets population according to the 2021 census):

- Dolany (244)
- Habrová (39)

== Etymology ==
The name Dolany is derived from the Czech word důl (in Old Czech written as dól), i.e. 'valley'.

== Demographics ==
Historical population
Year	Pop.	±%
1869	418	—
1880	413	−1.2%
1890	476	+15.3%
1900	533	+12.0%
1910	506	−5.1%
1921	450	−11.1%
1930	484	+7.6%
1950	372	−23.1%
1961	378	+1.6%
1970	348	−7.9%
1980	283	−18.7%
1991	234	−17.3%
2001	227	−3.0%
2011	279	+22.9%
2021	283	+1.4%
Source: Censuses
