= Doljani, Konjic =

Doljani Дољани
- Village
- Location within Bosnia and Herzegovina
- Coordinates: 43°29′52″N 18°14′30″E
- Country: Bosnia and Herzegovina
- Entity: Federation of Bosnia and Herzegovina
- Canton: Herzegovina-Neretva
- Municipality: Konjic

Area
  - Total: 1.88 sq mi (4.87 km^{2})

Population (2013)
  - Total: 29
  - Density: 15/sq mi (6.0/km^{2})
- Time zone: UTC+1 (CET)
  - Summer (DST): UTC+2 (CEST)

Doljani (Cyrillic: Дољани) is a village in the municipality of Konjic, Bosnia and Herzegovina.

== Demographics ==
According to the 2013 census, its population was 29, all Bosniaks.
