= Dolany, Lesser Poland Voivodeship =

Dolany
- Village
- Location within Poland
- Coordinates: 52°12′33″N 17°56′41″E
- Country: Poland
- Voivodeship: Lesser Poland
- County: Proszowice
- Gmina: Koszyce

Dolany [dɔˈlanɨ] is a village in the administrative district of Gmina Koszyce, within Proszowice County, Lesser Poland Voivodeship, in southern Poland.
