= Witów, Proszowice County =

Witów
- Village
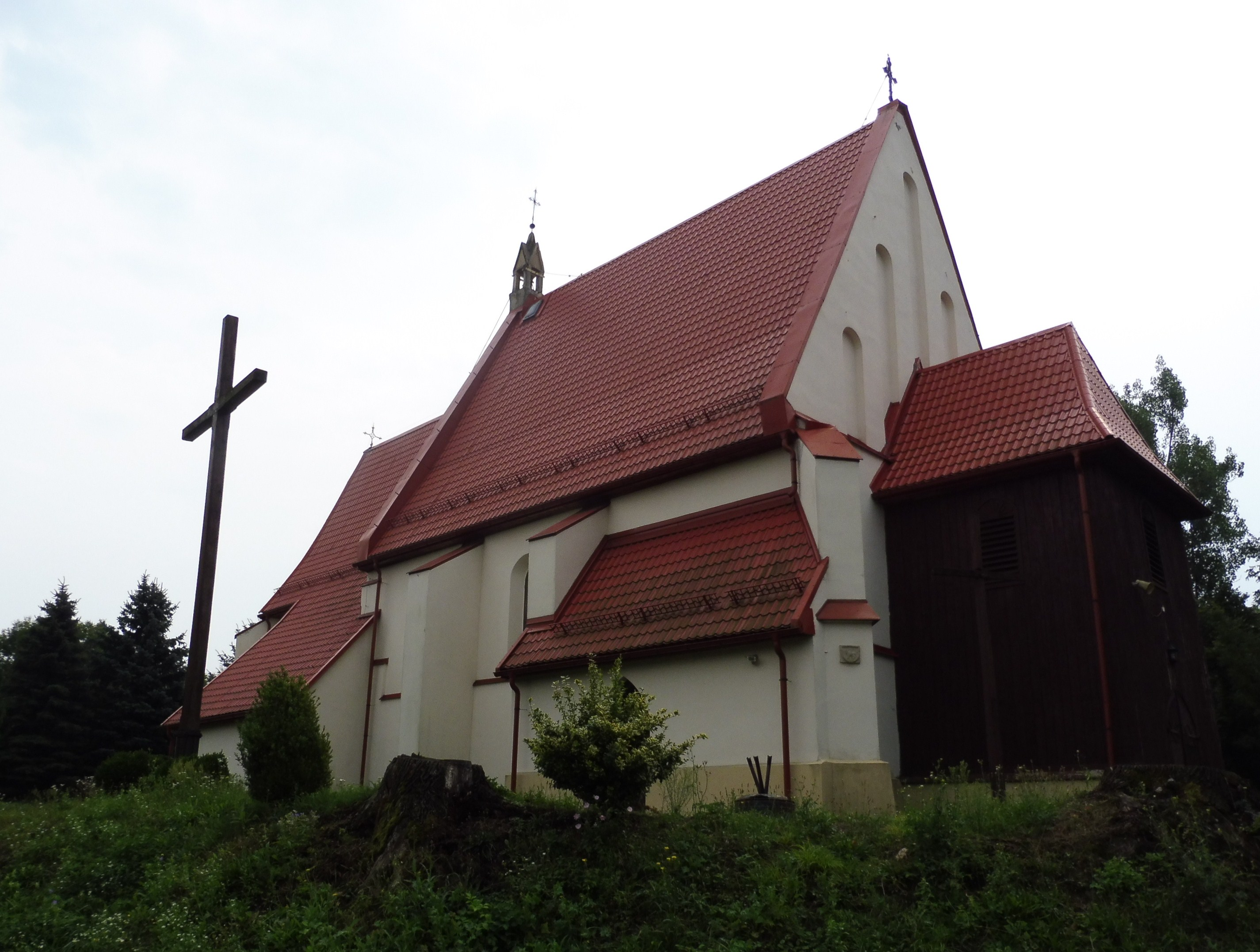

- Location within Poland
- Coordinates: 50°10′N 20°34′E
- Country: Poland
- Voivodeship: Lesser Poland
- County: Proszowice
- Gmina: Koszyce

Witów [ˈvituf] is a village in the administrative district of Gmina Koszyce, within Proszowice County, Lesser Poland Voivodeship, in southern Poland.
