= Morsko, Lesser Poland Voivodeship =

Morsko
- Village
- Location within Poland
- Coordinates: 50°9′N 20°33′E
- Country: Poland
- Voivodeship: Lesser Poland
- County: Proszowice
- Gmina: Koszyce

Morsko [ˈmɔrskɔ] is a village in the administrative district of Gmina Koszyce, within Proszowice County, Lesser Poland Voivodeship, in southern Poland.
