= Dolany (Pardubice District) =

- Municipality
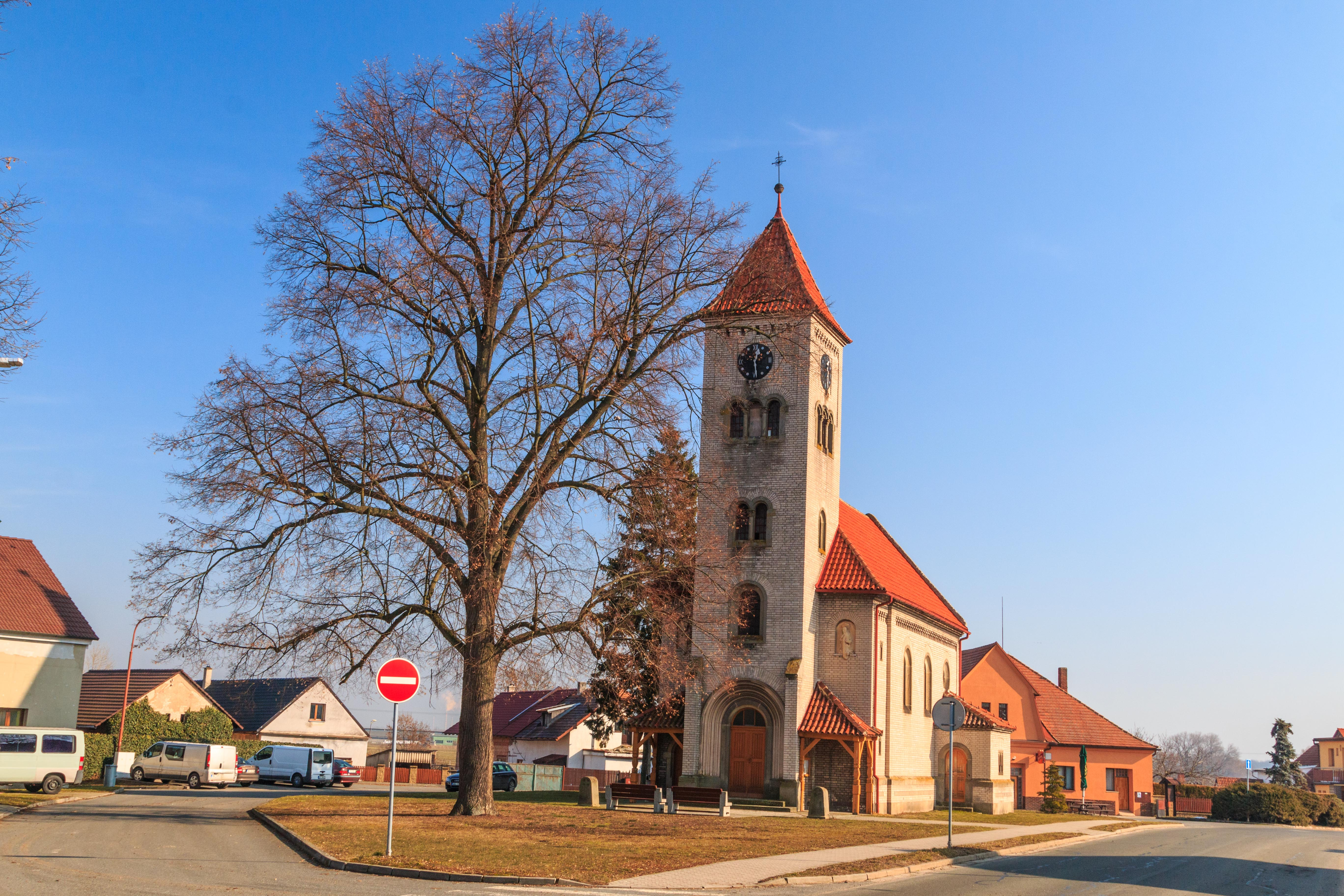
- Church of Saint Adalbert

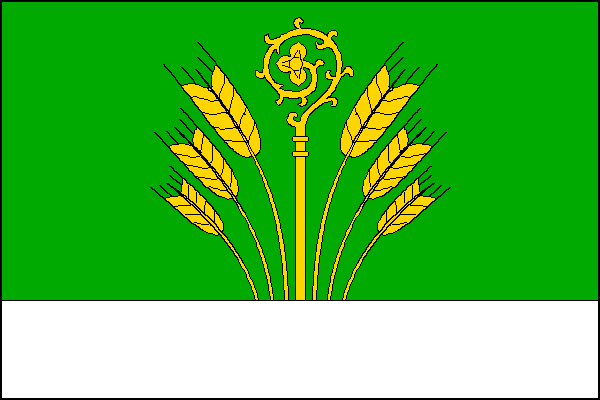
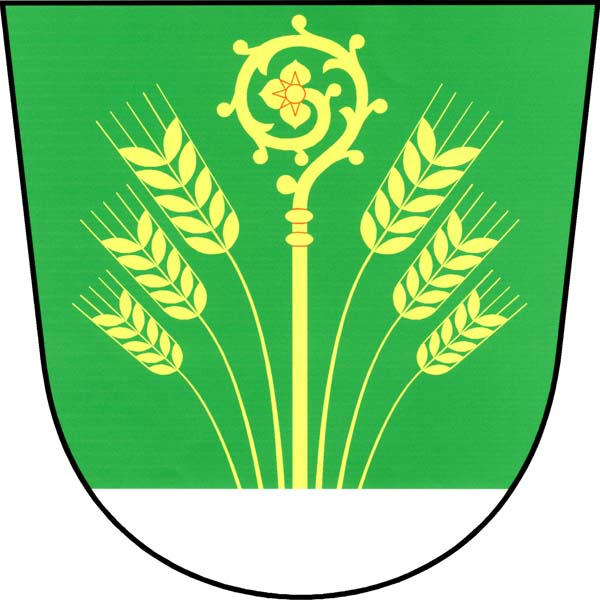
- Flag Coat of arms

- Location in the Czech Republic
- Coordinates: 50°6′48″N 15°41′30″E
- Country: Czech Republic
- Region: Pardubice
- District: Pardubice
- First mentioned: 1073

Area
  - Total: 6.46 km^{2} (2.49 sq mi)
- Elevation: 226 m (741 ft)

Population (2026-01-01)
  - Total: 437
  - Density: 67.6/km^{2} (175/sq mi)
- Time zone: UTC+1 (CET)
  - Summer (DST): UTC+2 (CEST)
- Postal code: 533 45
- Website: www.obecdolany.cz

Dolany is a municipality and village in Pardubice District in the Pardubice Region of the Czech Republic. It has about 400 inhabitants.

== Etymology ==
The name is derived from the Czech word důl (in Old Czech written as dól), i.e. 'valley'.

== Demographics ==
Historical population
Year	Pop.	±%
1869	651	—
1880	684	+5.1%
1890	674	−1.5%
1900	614	−8.9%
1910	604	−1.6%
1921	571	−5.5%
1930	606	+6.1%
1950	512	−15.5%
1961	506	−1.2%
1970	427	−15.6%
1980	385	−9.8%
1991	340	−11.7%
2001	331	−2.6%
2011	379	+14.5%
2021	395	+4.2%
Source: Censuses
