= Dolany (Kladno District) =

- Municipality
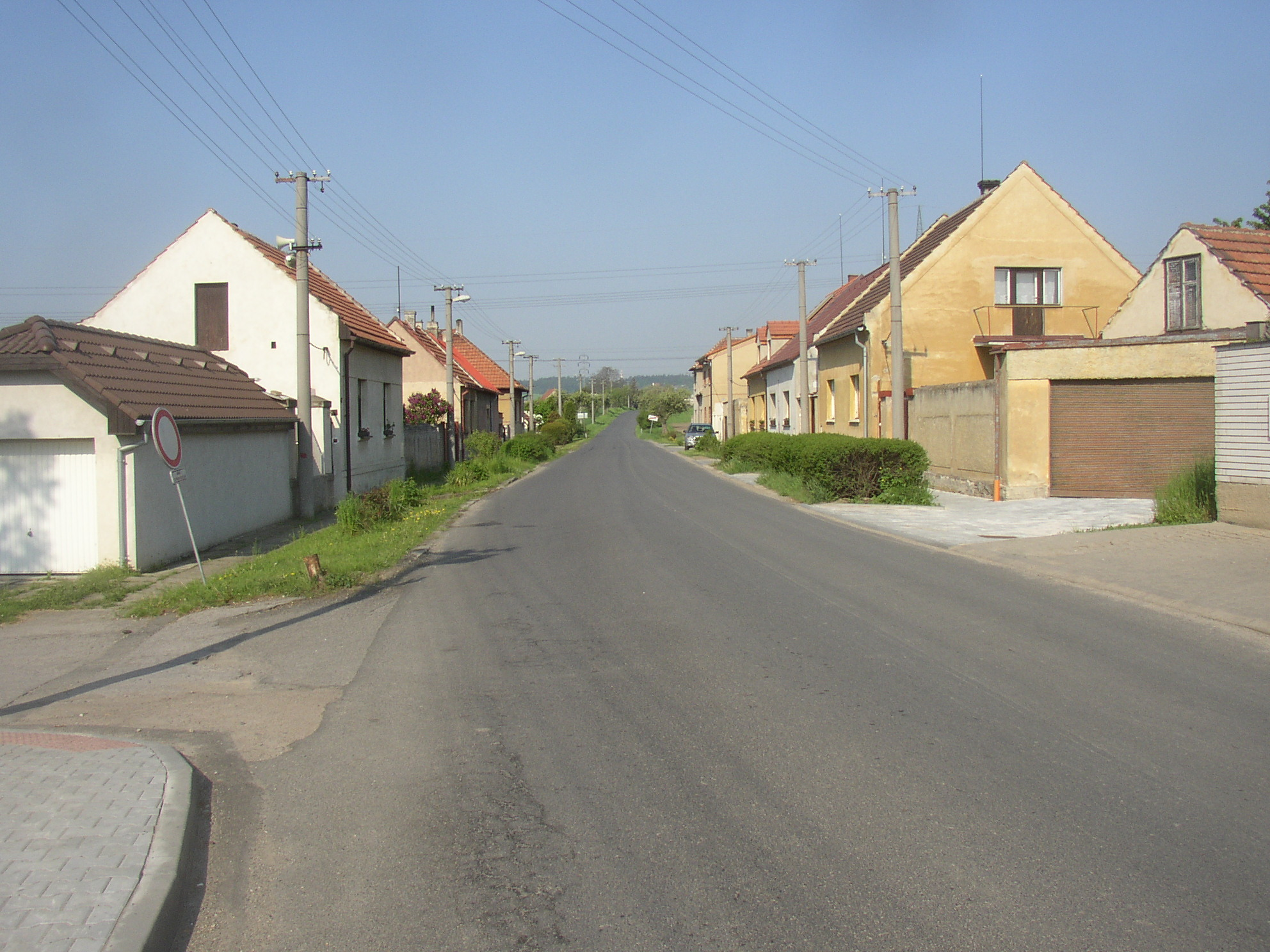
- Main street

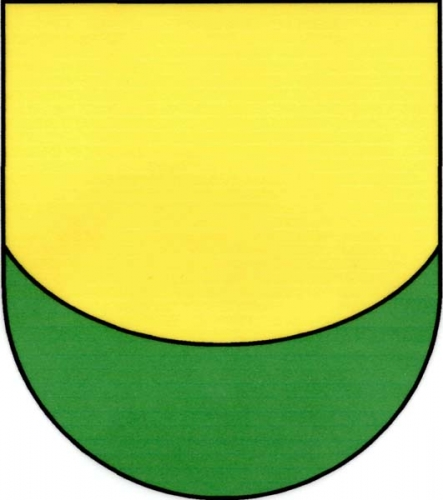
- Flag Coat of arms

- Location in the Czech Republic
- Coordinates: 50°6′56″N 14°8′59″E
- Country: Czech Republic
- Region: Central Bohemian
- District: Kladno
- First mentioned: 1384

Area
  - Total: 3.00 km^{2} (1.16 sq mi)
- Elevation: 365 m (1,198 ft)

Population (2026-01-01)
  - Total: 328
  - Density: 109/km^{2} (283/sq mi)
- Time zone: UTC+1 (CET)
  - Summer (DST): UTC+2 (CEST)
- Postal code: 273 51
- Website: www.dolany-kladno.cz

Dolany is a municipality and village in Kladno District in the Central Bohemian Region of the Czech Republic. It has about 300 inhabitants.

== Etymology ==
The name is derived from the Czech word důl (in Old Czech written as dól), i.e. 'valley'. The initial name of the village was Dolánky (a diminutive of Dolany), but after the village grew, the name was changed to Dolany.

== Demographics ==
Historical population
Year	Pop.	±%
1869	263	—
1880	252	−4.2%
1890	280	+11.1%
1900	302	+7.9%
1910	315	+4.3%
1921	282	−10.5%
1930	315	+11.7%
1950	255	−19.0%
1961	229	−10.2%
1970	195	−14.8%
1980	187	−4.1%
1991	156	−16.6%
2001	184	+17.9%
2011	269	+46.2%
2021	285	+5.9%
Source: Censuses
