= Malkowice, Opole Voivodeship =

Malkowice Malkowitz
- Village
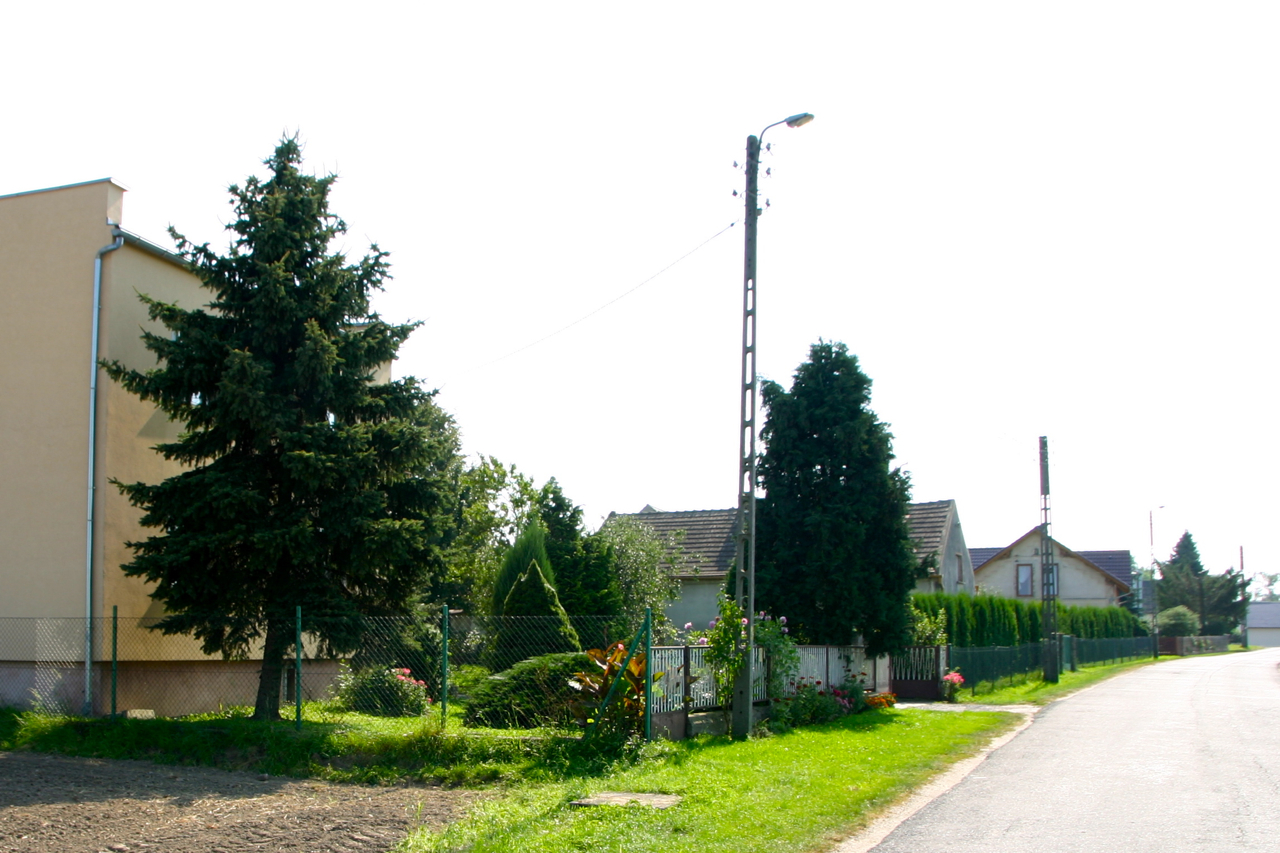

- Location within Poland
- Coordinates: 50°21′7″N 18°0′20″E
- Country: Poland
- Voivodeship: Opole
- County: Prudnik
- Gmina: Głogówek
- Time zone: UTC+1 (CET)
  - Summer (DST): UTC+2 (CEST)
- Vehicle registration: OPR

Malkowice ([malkɔˈvit͡sɛ], additional name in German: Malkowitz) is a village in the administrative district of Gmina Głogówek, within Prudnik County, Opole Voivodeship, in southern Poland, close to the Czech border. It is located in the Prudnik Land in the historic region of Upper Silesia.
