= Małkowice, Lower Silesian Voivodeship =

Małkowice
- Village
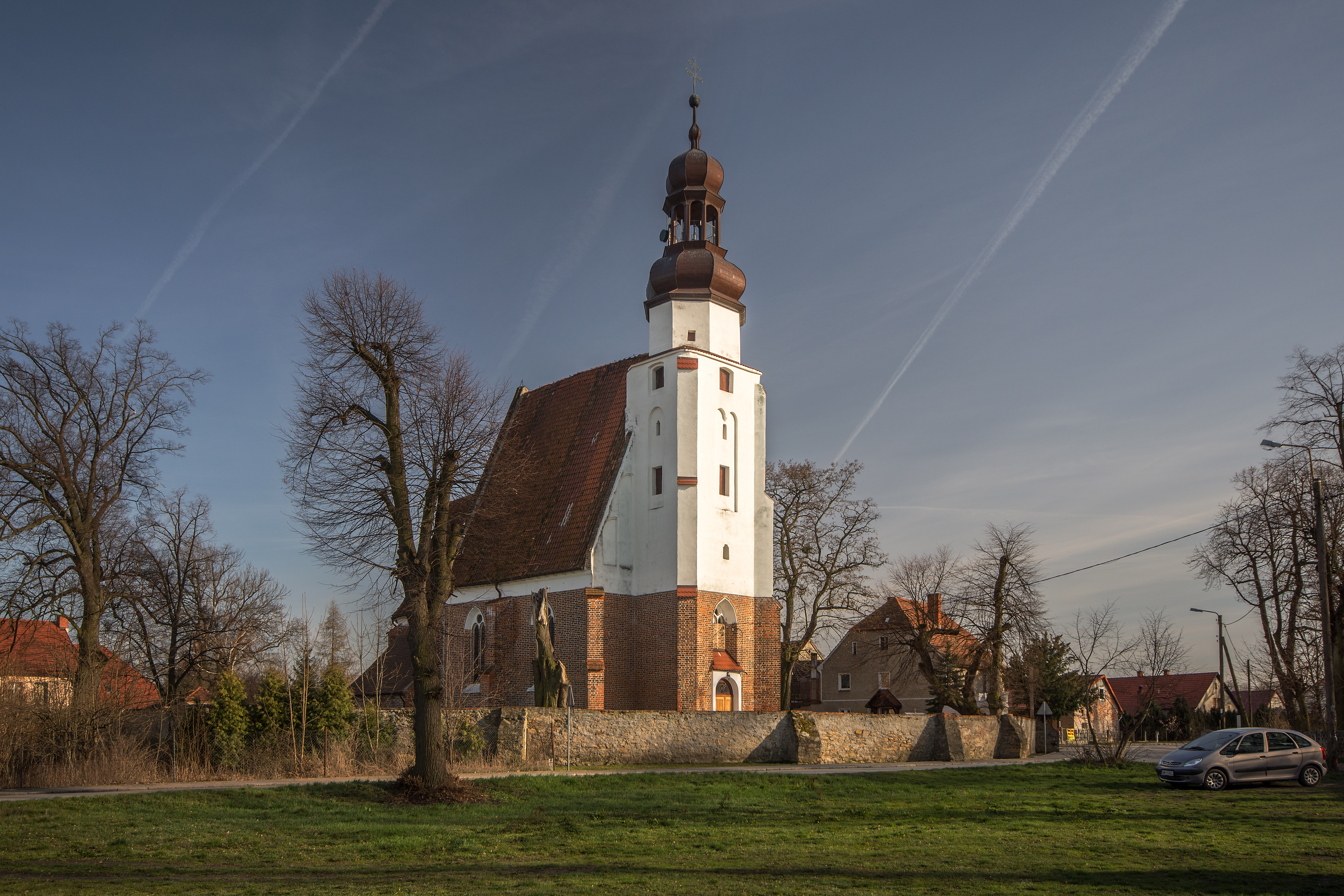

- Location within Poland
- Coordinates: 51°5′N 16°49′E
- Country: Poland
- Voivodeship: Lower Silesian
- County: Wrocław
- Gmina: Kąty Wrocławskie
- Elevation: 128 m (420 ft)
- Population: 500

Małkowice ([mau̯kɔˈvit͡sɛ]) is a village in the administrative district of Gmina Kąty Wrocławskie, within Wrocław County, Lower Silesian Voivodeship, in south-western Poland.
