= Prospero Provana =

Italian nobleman, merchant, and banker in Kraków

- Coat of arms after receiving indygenat
- Coat of arms: Provana coat of arms
- Predecessor: Guglielmo Provana or Nicolo Provana del Sabbione
- Born: around 1520; Collegno
- Died: September 20, 1584; Kraków
- Wife: Elżbieta Irzykiewiczówna
- Children: Oktawian, Samuel, Barbara, Bona

Prospero Provana of his own coat of arms (born around 1520, died on 20 September 1584 in Kraków) was an Italian nobleman from Piedmont, a merchant, and banker in Kraków. He served as the first postmaster of the royal post in Poland (1558–1562), royal secretary to Sigismund Augustus (1570), non-castle starosta of Będzin, and żupnik in Kraków (1577–1580).

He arrived in Poland either with his brother Traiano or later, at his brother's urging. He engaged in trade of fabrics, wine, and salt, and obtained Polish indygenat. Sigismund Augustus entrusted him with the organization and management of the royal post, as well as, for a certain time, intermediation in the transfer of interest on Neapolitan sums. By the grant of Stephen Báthory, he administered Żupy krakowskie, amassed considerable landed wealth, and owned several tenements in Kraków, leading the local Italian colony. Associated with supporters of the Reformation (possibly leaving Piedmont for religious reasons), he was a Calvinist and maintained close contacts with antitrinitarians, hosting Fausto Sozzini, among others. However, towards the end of his life, he converted to Catholicism.

== Early life ==
=== Origins and arrival in Poland ===
He came from a noble family from Piedmont, and he was the son of Guglielmo Provana or Nicola Provana del Sabbione. He was born perhaps in Collegno, probably in the early 1520s. The exact date is not known. Carignano or Caragnano is also mentioned as another possible place of origin for his family.

He probably came to Poland (Note: Wyrozumski (1960, p. 38) states that his family had long been settled in Poland and had held the Będzin estate since the reign of Alexander Jagiellon. However, this information is not confirmed by other studies.) together with his older brother Traiano or later, at his urging, in the early 1550s, when persecution of supporters of the Reformation was taking place in Piedmont, ordered by Duke Emmanuel Philibert. A fragment from the travel diary of the nuncio Ippolito Aldobrandini, who visited one of the Provana estates, points to such a background and time of arrival. Presumably, he initially remained in the service of Queen Bona. He quickly acclimated, and substantial financial resources facilitated the development of his interests, mainly in the trade of fabrics and wine, as well as banking. In 1557, together with his brother, he received Polish indygenat, (Note: Tygielski (2005, p. 384) states that the brothers were then ennobled, contrary to Quirini-Popławska (1985, p. 526).) which may indicate his rapid adaptation in the new country. He was probably inclined to stay in Poland for a long time.

=== Postmaster of the royal post ===
With his intelligence and entrepreneurial spirit, he attracted the attention of King Sigismund Augustus, and, like his brother, was associated with the royal chancellery (Prospero was mentioned as a royal secretary in the Royal Metrica, in a document dated 4 September 1570). The monarch, while striving to secure his inheritance from his mother, needed regular contact with Italy. Therefore, it was necessary to organize a regular postal connection between Kraków and Venice, and the monarch appointed Provana as its postmaster, according to the privilege Ordinatio postae Cracovia Venetias praeficitur from 18 October 1558. The post was to run using relay horses. The document provided that all costs (equipment, personnel, postal facilities, and stations along the route) were to be borne by the king, and the revenues from fees for private shipments were to be returned to the royal treasury. Additionally, Provana was obliged to submit accounts for expenses incurred in running the postal service. However, the privilege did not specify his remuneration. Most likely, a separate instruction from the monarch addressed this issue, whereby Prospero received an annual salary of 300 Polish złotys. (Note: Adamczewski (2003, p. 425) states that Provana's remuneration for directing the post office was the granting of the Będzin starostwo and the position of Kraków żupnik, which, however, is not confirmed by Quirini-Popławska (1985, p. 526).) Couriers departed from one of his Kraków tenements (on Floriańska Street or in the Main Square). According to Jan Ptaśnik, the brief content of the privilege and the small amount of detailed information resulted from a lack of a clear concept of postal operations.

Provana managed the postal service for four years, until 1562. There are no details available about his activities in this role, and the lack of postal revenues may indicate that he did not fare well. The ultimate reason for revoking the privilege granted to Provana is said to have been his conflict with the Thurn-Taxis family, which controlled postal connections in Austria, Hungary, and Italy. However, in 1564, this did not prevent him from most likely instructing a well-known Kraków merchant, Pietro Maffon from Brescia (died 1575), as the new postmaster, who obtained a privilege entrusting him with this task for 5 years, with an annual salary of 1500 thalers. Correspondence was to be transported on the Vilnius–Kraków–Venice route. Most likely, Maffon did not manage to organize the efficient functioning of the enterprise, and at the request of the monarch, even before the contract expired, he transferred the tasks to Sebastiano Montelupi (the latter received a privilege for this activity in November 1568).

=== Merchant activities ===
Another task entrusted to him by Sigismund Augustus was also related to Italian affairs. According to a document from 23 November 1569, Provana, with the assistance of Venetian Antonio de Angelis and other Italian bankers and royal agents in Naples, was to mediate in the collection and transfer of interest from Neapolitan sums. The wide commercial contacts and constant relations with Italian banks were likely factors that influenced the assignment of these duties to him. It is not known how long he engaged in this activity or whether he received additional compensation for it, apart from an annual pension of 200 scudi from Neapolitan sums, granted on 22 August 1570. In the 1560s, he became involved in efforts to obtain weapons in Venice for the army of John Zápolya, the ruler of the Principality of Transylvania, during his conflict with Emperor Maximilian II.

Provana developed intense commercial activity in the trade of wine and fabrics, involving his brother as well. He often conducted business with the Venetian merchant Jakob Gastgebem, (Note: The scale of these trade relations can be evidenced by the fact that in 1568 Provana paid the overdue sum of 2,760 Polish złotys for the Venetian to the royal treasury (Quirini-Popławska (1985, p. 527)).) as well as with Italians settled in Kraków, with whom he also had disputes (for example, in 1574 with Lodovikio de Pello and Alessandro Baldi).

=== Salt business and Żupy krakowskie ===
He also became involved in the salt trade, which eventually dominated his commercial activities. Already during the reign of Sigismund Augustus, he co-organized a salt-making company, which received a privilege from the king (subsequently confirmed by Henryk III). It was one of the first companies of this kind in Poland, but it is not known whether it actually started its operations or whether the Italian withdrew from it.

On a larger scale, he began to engage in salt mining and trading during the reign of Stephen Báthory, who was favorably disposed towards him, also thanks to the patronage of his friends – Stanisław Cikowski and Giorgio Biandrata. In such a favorable situation, he was granted a lease of the Żupy krakowskie for a period of 3 years on 2 March 1577, (Note: The date given by Roman Rybarski in his work Wielickie żupy solne w latach 1497–1594. In the sources of the era, Provana with the title of a żupnik appears from March 28 of this year (Wyrozumski (1960, p. 39, footnote 24)).) with the obligation to pay an annual sum of 56,000 Polish złotys (and settle the debts for salt supplies left by his predecessor, Hieronim Bużeński). Holding the office of żupnik brought him substantial income, with his profit reportedly reaching 24,000 złotys in the first year alone. He also attempted to modernize the mines by announcing that he would give half of the income to anyone who introduced improvements in salt extraction. An Italian, Rocco Marconi, responded to this offer by inventing a device that facilitated the extraction of salt blocks. Żupnik obtained the monarch's approval for this project, but it is not known whether it was eventually implemented. (Note: Tygielski (2005, p. 171) states that this search for a partner took place after the new contract between the king and żupnik had already been concluded and was the result of declining revenues, which Provana himself was apparently unable to cope with.)

On 20 August 1578, the king concluded a new agreement with Provana, hoping for greater revenue. According to this agreement, żupnik was to receive 2000 złotys annually and be allowed to participate in profits if he paid an additional 80,000 złotys into the royal treasury, after deducting the costs of his salary and repairs. To encourage him to fulfill his duties conscientiously, it was stipulated that in the first year, his profit could amount to half of the additional income, and in subsequent years, one-tenth of the amount. (Note: According to Wyrozumski (1960, pp. 39, 40–41), the new agreement was the result of Provana nearly doubling the income, with more favorable conditions for both parties. The hopes for further profit growth were based on plans to expand the salt works on a much larger scale than before. This is indicated by the fact that the new contract separated two leases: one for the salt mines (production of salt blocks and boiling on-site) and the other for rock salt (pieces and crumbs of contaminated salt chipped off during the extraction of salt blocks, according to Horyń (2018, p. 36)), which could be transported to more distant salt works. However, according to Tygielski (2005, pp. 170–171), unexpectedly, żupnik himself resigned around 1577. His successor recorded a sharp drop in income. At that time, Provana expressed his desire to reassume the position, but the king, influenced by advisors, did not accept his proposal for an annual rent. Instead, he entered into a contract with Provana with a fixed salary. Other sources do not confirm such a sequence of events.) However, the royal expectations remained unfulfilled, as the revenues from the mines (for the period from 18 September 1578 to 18 March 1580) only reached half of the expected amount. In March 1580, Provana resigned from the administration of the salt mines. The reasons for his departure, halfway through the three-year lease, remain unknown.

Assessments of Provana's tenure as żupnik remain divergent. His critics accused him of running the saltworks in a predatory manner, which may be confirmed by the review of their condition at the end of 1580, indicating a dire situation. Adolf Pawiński, in his work Skarbowość w Polsce i jej dzieje za Stefana Batorego, states that the Italian's mismanagement led to a striking decline in salt mine revenues. The most significant drop in profits allegedly occurred after the change in management format in 1578, which the king agreed to, encouraged by the previous good balance. Jan Ptaśnik, however, viewed the situation differently. According to him, Provana took over the mines after a weak, less energetic predecessor, showing energy in their modernization efforts, and the recorded decline in income during his tenure still exceeded the revenues from Bużeński's tenure. Upon his resignation, Provana also received thanks from the king and a certificate of good performance of his duties. Jerzy Wyrozumski also portrayed his activities positively, highlighting his evident entrepreneurship and efficiency, as well as his steps to combat illegal saltworks, which undermined the mine's income. Similarly, the Italian historian Lucio Biasiori attributed to him transparent management and the demonstration of the qualities of an excellent administrator.

During his tenure as żupnik, Provana also engaged in private initiatives related to salt extraction, in which his position assisted him. Most likely, under the first contract, he obtained the rights to develop such activities, as evidenced by the nearly twofold increase in salt mine revenues during the first year. It is known that he was very active in the intense movement of establishing new saltworks, located far from the Kraków salt mines at the time. On 11 April 1577, his company, with the participation of Cikowski and Florian Morsztyn, the Bergmeister of Wieliczka, obtained a privilege to build a new shaft in Wieliczka for the extraction of rock salt. (Note: Pieces and crumbs of contaminated salt detached during the extraction of salt blocks. Rock salt was used in brewing (Horyń (2018, p. 36)).) It was completed at great cost and opened on September 9 of the same year. (Note: According to Wyrozumski (1960, p. 39), it was an investment made within a company formed during the reign of Sigismund II Augustus, while in Quirini-Popławska (1985, p. 527), there is mention of a new company.) It is not known whether the Italian established a saltworks for which this shaft would serve as the raw material base. Perhaps both he and his partners were satisfied with the opportunity to trade in various types of salt, which were extracted together with rock salt, as envisaged by the royal privilege as compensation for the costs incurred.

In addition, he established saltworks in Stężyca Nadwieprzańska, in Będzin (together with the elder of the Kraków Jewish community, Joachim Ezdrasz), (Note: According to the preserved contract from 11 September 1577, Joachim Ezdrasz was to be responsible for the construction of the necessary facilities (such as the boiling tower, pans, and others), directing the production of salt, and covering the costs of transporting wood. Meanwhile, Provana ensured the delivery of the appropriate quantities of rock salt and the free logging of wood from the Będzin starostwo. The profits from the saltworks were to be divided equally between them (Wyrozumski (1960, pp. 41–42, 58)).) and in Bydgoszcz (with Jakub Rokossowski and Szymon Ługowski, the prelate of Miechów). The first of these was established in late summer 1577, the second in September of the same year, and the third as part of a partnership in mid-September 1579. Also, in connection with these ventures, Provana acted against illegal saltworks.

Particularly significant for him was the saltworks in Będzin, located on an important salt trade route connecting the salt mines with Silesia, facilitating both sales and the transport of raw materials. This enterprise had the characteristics of a private interest, with Provana not presenting any accounts of it to the state treasury. Although it was to remain in his hands only while he was żupnik, there was no provision for its takeover by the state or his successor in office. The supplied raw material remained exempt from any duties, with Provana paying only a calculated price on-site in the salt mine. This may have been due to the fact that at that time, principles for the state's share in the pure profits of saltworks had not yet been developed (which occurred in 1580 when its amount was set at one-quarter).

The Będzin enterprise presumably operated well, and after resigning from the position of żupnik, the Italian continued to run it, perhaps until a certain specified time. He accumulated significant amounts of rock salt there, presumably in accordance with an unrecorded agreement, under which he was specifically given time to export the raw material. He sold (or subleased) the saltworks, along with the Będzin starostwo, to Gian Battista Cettis, a relative and friend. The further functioning of the enterprise, which also attracted many merchants from Silesia, now undermined the interests of Żupy krakowskie and provoked a reaction from żupnik Sebastian Lubomirski. As a result of his intervention, on 12 March 1581, the royal chancellery issued letters to Provana and Cettis, aimed at terminating its activities. (Note: The document addressed to Provana prohibited him from selling salt in places where it would harm the interests of żupnik, while the one addressed to Cettis forbade him from boiling salt in Będzin, citing similar reasons (Wyrozumski (1960, p. 44)).) However, the profitable saltworks, which also absorbed significant investments, was eventually relocated to the not-too-distant Ujejsce in the Duchy of Siewierz, which enjoyed autonomy from the rest of the state, so the authority and influence of żupnik did not extend there. This happened thanks to Provana, either in 1581 or in the 1590s, already after his death.

As for the other saltworks, he owned the one established in Stężyca until 22 October 1580. The Bydgoszcz enterprise ceased its operations in the same year, although the partnership agreement that established it was to remain in force for four years. This was due to Rokossowski's death, one of the partners, and Provana's resignation from the position of żupnik, which hindered the development of the saltworks, to which rock salt was to flow from Żupy krakowskie. Perhaps the Italian withdrew from this partnership at that time. Ultimately, the saltworks was purchased by Stanisław Lubomirski and Stefan Grudziński, the castellan of Nakło.

=== Assets and social standing ===
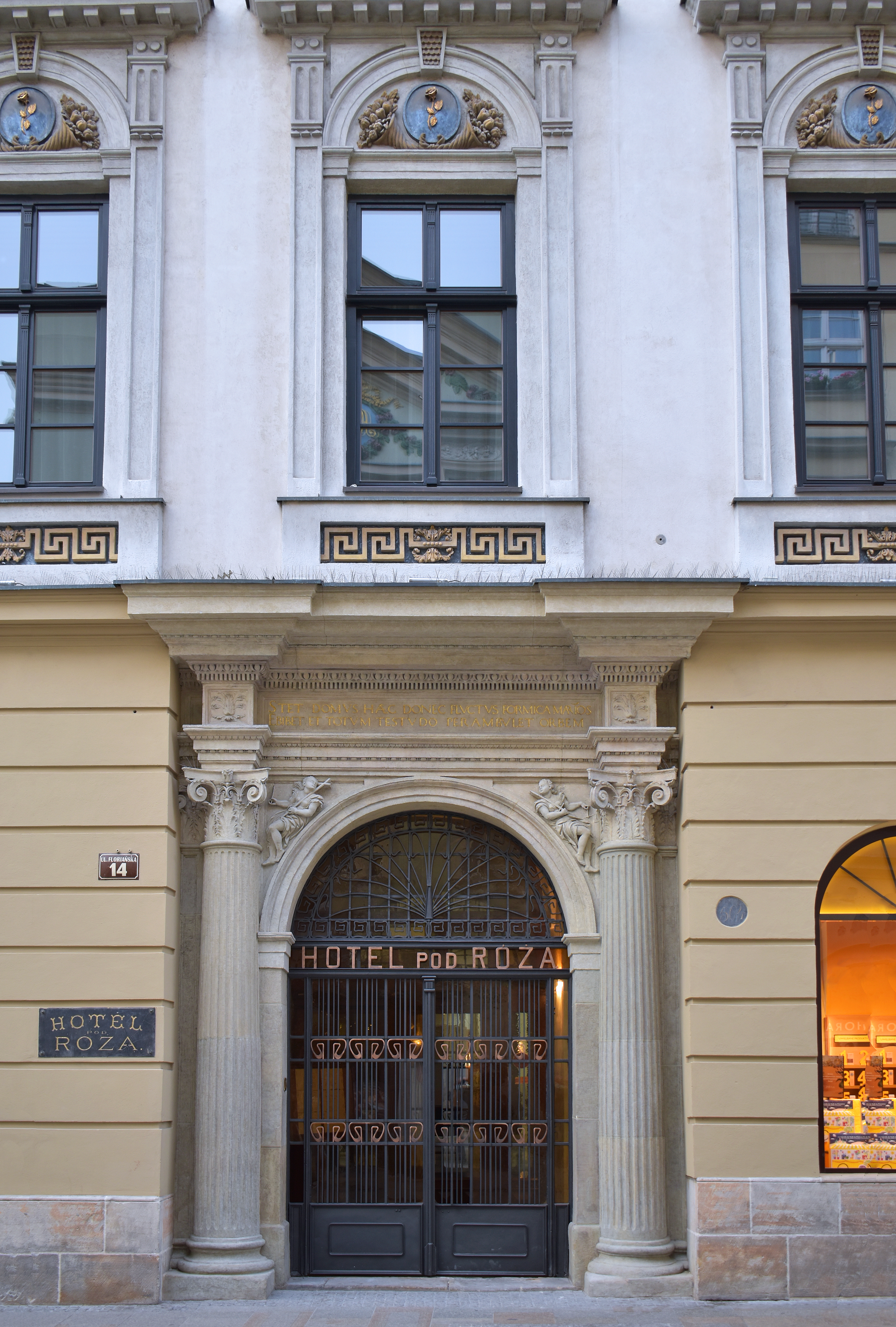
Renaissance portal of the former Provana's building on Floriańska Street

His activities across various fields, despite numerous difficulties, brought him significant financial benefits. Provana amassed a considerable landed estate in Lesser Poland, mainly through investing funds from trade and providing loans to the gentry against the pledge of villages, from which he derived income or took ownership. One of his largest debtors was Stanisław Szafraniec of Pieskowa Skała – shortly after 1560, he pledged the village of Rogów to Provana, but over the following years, the debt grew. Therefore, in 1582, Provana received from him the assignment of Rogów and (located nearby) Wyszogród, Kobylanki, Chrostowicza, and Wola. Among other borrowers from the 1570s are: King Henryk III (over 6000 Polish złotys), (Note: In exchange for the loan, Provana received an assignment of Śledziejowice in the Kraków region, confiscated from expat Samuel Zborowski (Quirini-Popławska (1985, p. 527)).) Castellan of Podlaskie Maciej Sowicki (a sum of 5000 Polish złotys), Castellan of Sączów Jan Cikowski (3000 Polish złotys), starosta of Sandomierz Andrzej Firlej (5000 Polish złotys). Additionally, he obtained the villages of Kokoszewo in the Kraków region (from Hieronim and Andrzej Morski), Nadzów (from Joachim Glinicz), Budziejowice and Piotrkowice (from Mikołaj Dłuski for 17,000 Polish złotys), and in 1579, he acquired Pamięcice, Pałecznica, and the empty village of Biedzina from Abraham and Jan Lasocki.

He also leased the non-urban starostwo of Będzin from 11 March 1570, when the sons and nephews of the Kraków Castellan Marcin Zborowski assigned this estate to him. He sold or subleased it to Cettis (Note: Wyrozumski (1960, pp. 43–44) provides information about the sale, adding that as early as March 1581, the king agreed to return the starostwo to Provana. Quirini-Popławska (1985, p. 528) suggests the possibility of subleasing due to the oldest son of the Italian retaining rights to the starostwo.) at the end of 1579 or the beginning of 1580. (Note: The Royal Metric recorded the transaction under the dates 1579 and 8 January 1580 (Chłapowski (2017, p. 61)).) Already in the following year, he regained the starostwo, which Cettis reassigned on 6 March 1581, and remained in the hands of Prospero Provana until his death. According to the tax register from 1581, Provana owned six villages in the Proszowice County, and eight years later, his heirs divided among themselves the villages of Bolów, Ilkowice, Sudołek, Budziejowice, Lasów (Łaszów), Nadzów, Piotrkowice, Rogów, and a part of Pamięcice.

In Kraków, he used or owned several tenements, often as collateral – one on Wiślna Street (1565), three on the Main Square (1562–1568), one on Sławkowska Street (1571), two on the Main Square (acquired from Mikołaj Tarnowski and Jan Myśliszewski), one on Szewska Street (acquired from Kacper Maciejowski in 1578), and one on Floriańska Street. (Note: The tenement known today as Hotel Pod Różą (Rożek (2000, p. 75)).)

Provana served as the patron and leader of the Italian community in Kraków, mediating disputes, overseeing the execution of wills, and caring for orphans and their estates. In comparison to his brother, he appeared to display greater dynamism in business and consistency in taking on new challenges. His extensive banking activities contributed to strengthening his position and gaining influence beyond the Italian community. The purchases of tenements, and especially landed estates, indicate his good understanding of the local value system and a willingness to fully assimilate.

=== Religious affairs ===
He converted to Calvinism, probably in the early 1550s, although his departure from Piedmont was likely connected to the Reformation. In 1558, he participated in the Calvinist synod in Książ Wielki, where he, along with his brother, requested a private minister. He also took part in the synod of Pińczów on 7 August 1559. From 1560 onwards, he maintained close contact with Stanisław Budziński, the first historian of the Reformation movement in Poland, who lived in his house for a while. Being friends with Blandrata, Provana became a guardian of antitrinitarian supporters, hosting them in Krakow or Rogów – Gian Paolo Alciati (1561), Giovanni Valentin Gentile (1561?), and Bernardino Ochino (1564; a year later he executed his will). He also served as an intermediary between Blandrata, after his departure to the Principality of Transylvania, and the Lesser Poland antitrinitarian community. In the 1570s and 1580s, his guests also included Andreas Dudith, Niccolò Buccella, Giovanni Michele Bruto, Fausto Sozzini, Giovanni Bernard Bonifacio, and Francesco Pucci. However, it is difficult to determine whether he fully shared their religious views. In 1580, a famous religious dispute between antitrinitarians, Calvinists, and Catholics, with the participation of Piotr Skarga, was to take place in his house.

He also played a certain role as a patron of humanistic works. Antonio Maria Nigrisoli dedicated to him the second edition of his translation of Georgics, published in Venice in 1552. Prospero also influenced the creation of Polonicae grammatices institutio by Pierre Statorius (1568), considered the first grammar of the Polish language. In the dedication addressed to Dudycz, the author wrote: I have made every effort (...) and, at the urging of friends, especially Prospero Provana, the most illustrious man who has deserved much from me (...).

Stanisław Hosius observed with concern Provana's affiliation with the camp of non-conformists, suspecting him of intercepting his correspondence. However, over time, the Italian began to show a tendency to renounce his support for the Reformation and his previous religious views, perhaps due to fatigue and concern over constant religious disputes and chaos among the Protestants, as well as pressure from Catholics, mainly Jesuits. In 1581, the papal nuncio Giovanni Andrea Caligari made efforts to obtain the right to grant him absolution, but Provana hesitated, reportedly under the influence of his wife, a zealous Calvinist. According to the account of the nuncio Alberto Bolognetti from 1583, frequent meetings on theological and other issues were held in his house, and he was also respected among the "Italian heretics", who often visited him, maintaining correspondence with him as well. However, he intended to send his sons to study in Italy to be raised as Catholics. (Note: However, in 1587 they studied at the University of Ingolstadt (Quirini-Popławska (1985, p. 528)).) Eventually, he converted, which was confirmed in June 1584 by Antonio Possevino, reporting to Rome that Provana's withdrawal from his previous beliefs and his profession of the Catholic faith occurred in the presence of another Jesuit, Stanisław Warszewicki.

=== Death and burial ===
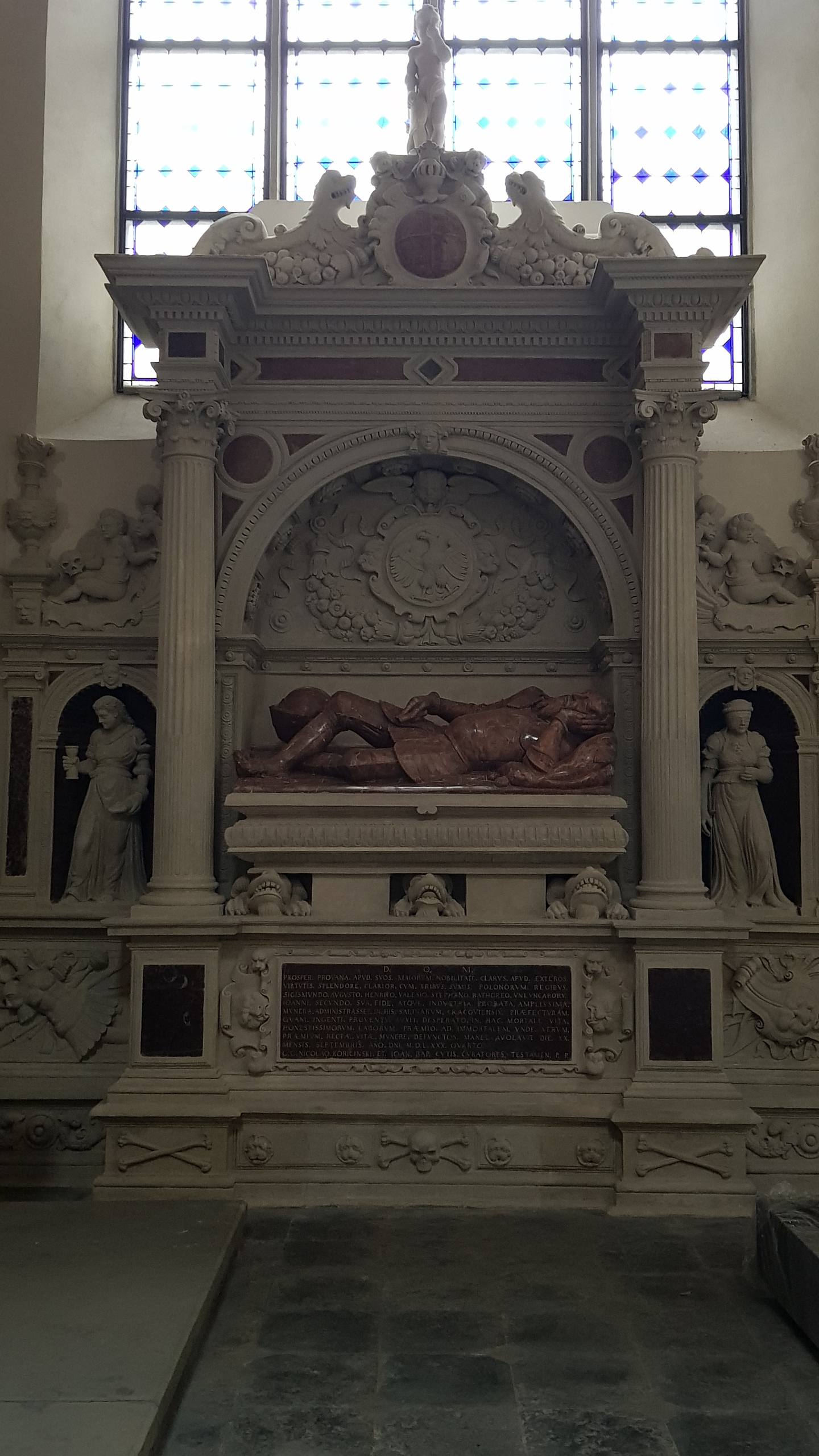
Provana's tombstone in the Dominican church

In his later years, Provana contemplated the idea of going to Italy and settling in Venice. From 1583 onwards, he suffered from persistent health problems. He died on 20 September 1584. He was laid to rest in the chapel of St. Joseph in the Dominican church in Kraków. The executors of his will – the Kraków żupnik Mikołaj Koryciński and his relative Gian Battista Cettis – erected a grand, mannerist tomb for him, made of sandstone and marble, with a sculpture of the deceased depicted in a Sansovinian pose.

=== Marriage and offspring ===
He married Elżbieta, the daughter of Jan Irzykowicz, the owner of Baciki and the starosta of Mielnik, with whom he had four children:

- Oktawian (died 1591), starosta of Będzin;
- Samuel (died 1591);
- Barbara, who married Andrzej Samuel Dembiński, the castellan of Biecz, in December 1590. From their marriage, she had seven daughters. She and her husband leased the starostwo of Będzin from 1584 to 1591, after the death of her brother and parents. On 14 May 1593, she received confirmation of lifelong possession of the estate for herself and Samuel. She also inherited a tenement on Floriańska Street. She died in 1621; (Note: Noga (1995, p. 34) erroneously lists her as Barbara Ujejska, who was to remarry after the death of her spouse to Malcher Pudłowski, the son of a townsman from Olkusz.)
- Bona.

== Commemoration in 2008 ==
In 2008, the 450th anniversary of the Polish Post was celebrated. On this occasion, a special miniature sheet of three stamps, designed by Maciej Jędrysik, was issued. It featured historical panoramas of Kraków and Venice from the modern era, as well as portraits of King Sigismund Augustus, Prospero Provana, and Sebastian Montelupi. A reproduction of Provana's privilege was also included on the stamp with the monarch's likeness, as well as on the first day of issue envelope. The commemorative stamps, each with a face value of 1.45 PLN and a circulation of 500,000 pieces, were put into circulation on 15 September 2008.

== Bibliography ==
- Adamczewski, Jan (2003). Mała encyklopedia Krakowa. Kraków: Hurnex. ISBN 8391880206.
- Biasiori, Lucio (2016). "Provana del Sabbione, Prospero". Treccani. Dizionario Biografico degli Italiani (in Italian).
- Budka, Włodzimierz (1939–1946). "Dembiński Samuel Andrzej". Polish Biographical Dictionary. Dąbrowski Jan Henryk – Dunin Piotr Stanisław. Vol. V. Kraków: Polska Akademia Umiejętności.
- Chłapowski, Krzysztof (1986). "Starostowie w Małopolsce 1565–1668". In Izydorczyk, Anna; Wyczański, Andrzej (eds.). Społeczeństwo staropolskie. Studia i szkice. Vol. IV. Warsaw: Państwowe Wydawnictwo Naukowe.
- Chłapowski, Krzysztof (2017). Starostowie niegrodowi w Koronie 1565–1795 (materiały źródłowe). Warsaw–Bellerive-sur-Allier: Wydawnictwo DiG – Edition La Rama. ISBN 978-83-286-0024-9.
- Cynarski, Stanisław (1997). Zygmunt August (II ed.). Wrocław–Warsaw–Kraków: Zakład Narodowy im. Ossolińskich – Wydawnictwo. ISBN 83-04-04373-4.
- Stachowski, Antoni Henryk, ed. (2000). Encyklopedia Krakowa. Warsaw-Kraków: Wydawnictwo Naukowe PWN. ISBN 83-01-13325-2.
- Goszczyński, Artur (2019). "Działalność Sebastiana Lubomirskiego jako żupnika krakowskiego w latach 1581–1592". Dzieje Biurokracji. IX. ISSN 2544-9761.
- Horyń, Ewa (2018). Słownictwo z zakresu górnictwa solnego XVI–XVIII wieku na tle polszczyzny ogólnej. Kraków: Wydawnictwo Naukowe Uniwersytetu Pedagogicznego. ISBN 978-83-8084-103-1.
- Kępińska, Alina (2014). "Polonicae grammatices institutio Piotra Statoriusa-Stojeńskiego" (PDF). Poradnik Językowy (8). ISSN 0551-5343.
- Korolko, Mieczysław (1991). Seminarium Rzeczypospolitej Królestwa Polskiego. Humaniści w kancelarii królewskiej Zygmunta Augusta. Warsaw: Wiedza Powszechna. ISBN 83-214-0736-6.
- Noga, Zdzisław (1995). "Przybysze wśród osiadłej szlachty siewierskiej w XVII wieku" (PDF). Rocznik Naukowo-Dydaktyczny WSP W Krakowie. Prace Historyczne. XVII (167). ISSN 0137-5873.
- Ptaśnik, Jan (1907). "Z dziejów kultury włoskiego Krakowa". Rocznik Krakowski. IX.
- Rożek, Michał (2000). Przewodnik po zabytkach i kulturze Krakowa (2 ed.). Warsaw-Kraków: Polish Scientific Publishers PWN. ISBN 83-01-10989-0.
- Tygielski, Wojciech (2005). Włosi w Polsce XVI–XVII wieku. Utracona szansa na modernizację. Warsaw: Biblioteka "Więzi". ISBN 838803281X.
- Quirini-Popławska, Danuta (1985). "Provana Prospero". Polski Słownik Biograficzny. Potocki Ignacy – Przerębski Mikołaj. Vol. XXVIII. Wrocław-Warsaw-Kraków-Gdańsk: Polska Akademia Nauk Instytut Historii, Wydawnictwo PAN, Ossolineum.
- Quirini-Popławska, Danuta (1984–1985). "Traiano Provana". Internetowy Polski Słownik Biograficzny (in Polish).
- Wyrozumski, Jerzy (1960). "Warzelnie soli krakowskiej na pograniczu śląsko-polskim w drugiej poł. XVI i pierwszej poł. XVII wieku". Zeszyty Naukowe Uniwersytetu Jagiellońskiego. Prace Historyczne. 26.
- Żukow-Karczewski, Marek (1989-08-16). "Początki poczty w dawnym Krakowie". Echo Krakowa. 158 (12967).
- "450 lat Poczty Polskiej 1558–2008". Katalog Znaków Pocztowych (in Polish). 2008-09-15.
- "450 lat Poczty Polskiej 1558–2008 (zapowiedź emisji)". Katalog Znaków Pocztowych (in Polish). 2008-09-30.
