= Gruszów =

Gruszów may refer to the following places in Poland:

- Gruszów, Lower Silesian Voivodeship (south-west Poland)
- Gruszów, Myślenice County in Lesser Poland Voivodeship (south Poland)
- Gruszów, Gmina Nowe Brzesko in Lesser Poland Voivodeship (south Poland)
- Gruszów, Gmina Pałecznica in Lesser Poland Voivodeship (south Poland)
- Hrušov (Ostrava) (Polish: Gruszów), part of the city of Ostrava
