= Gmina Ożarowice =

Gmina Ożarowice Ożarowice Commune
- Gmina
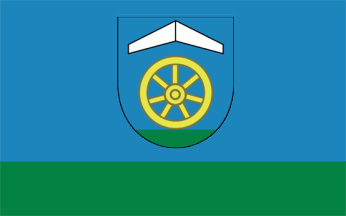
- Flag Coat of arms
- Interactive map of Gmina Ożarowice
- Coordinates (Ożarowice): 50°28′N 19°3′E
- Country: Poland
- Voivodeship: Silesian
- County: Tarnowskie Góry
- Seat: Ożarowice

Area
  - Total: 43.72 km^{2} (16.88 sq mi)

Population (2019-06-30)
  - Total: 5,794
  - Density: 132.5/km^{2} (343.2/sq mi)
- Website: http://www.ozarowice.pl/

Gmina Ożarowice is a rural gmina (administrative district) in Tarnowskie Góry County, Silesian Voivodeship, in southern Poland. Its seat is the village of Ożarowice, which lies approximately 14 kilometres (9 mi) east of Tarnowskie Góry and 25 km (16 mi) north of the regional capital Katowice.

The gmina covers an area of 43.72 square kilometres (16.9 sq mi), and as of 2019 its total population is 5,794.

== Villages ==
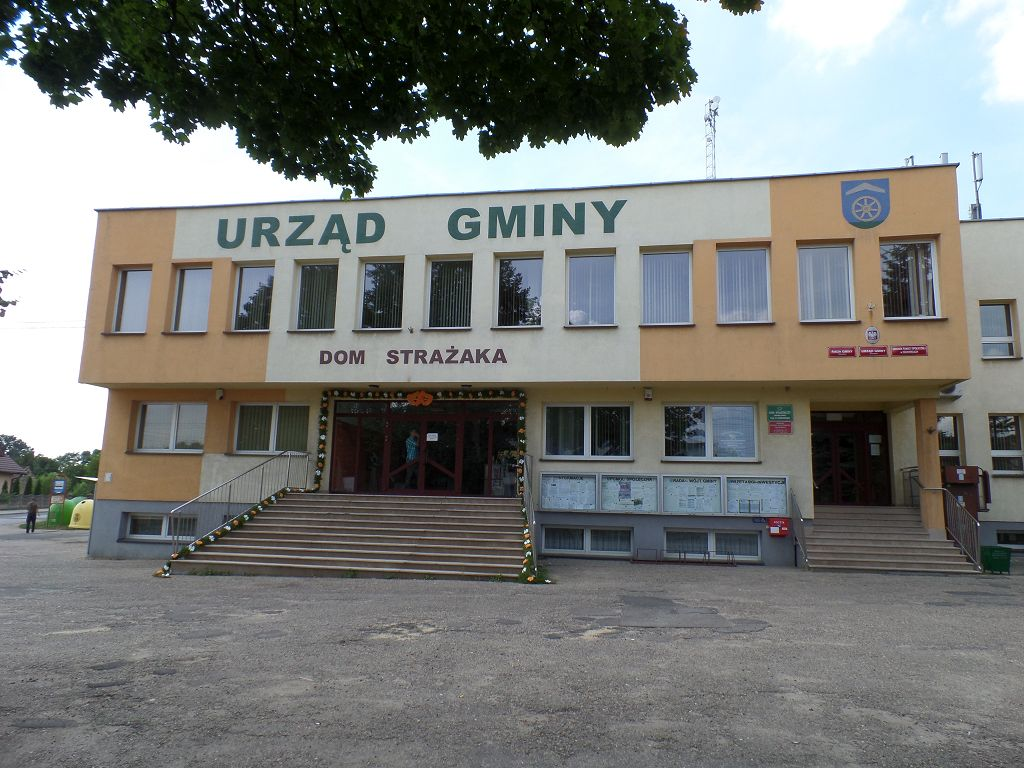
Urząd Gminy Ożarowice

Gmina Ożarowice contains the villages and settlements of Celiny, Niezdara, Ossy, Ożarowice, Pyrzowice, Sączów, Tąpkowice and Zendek.

== Neighbouring gminas ==
Gmina Ożarowice is bordered by the town of Miasteczko Śląskie and the gminas of Bobrowniki, Koziegłowy, Mierzęcice, Siewierz, Świerklaniec and Woźniki.
