= Lelowice-Kolonia =

- Village
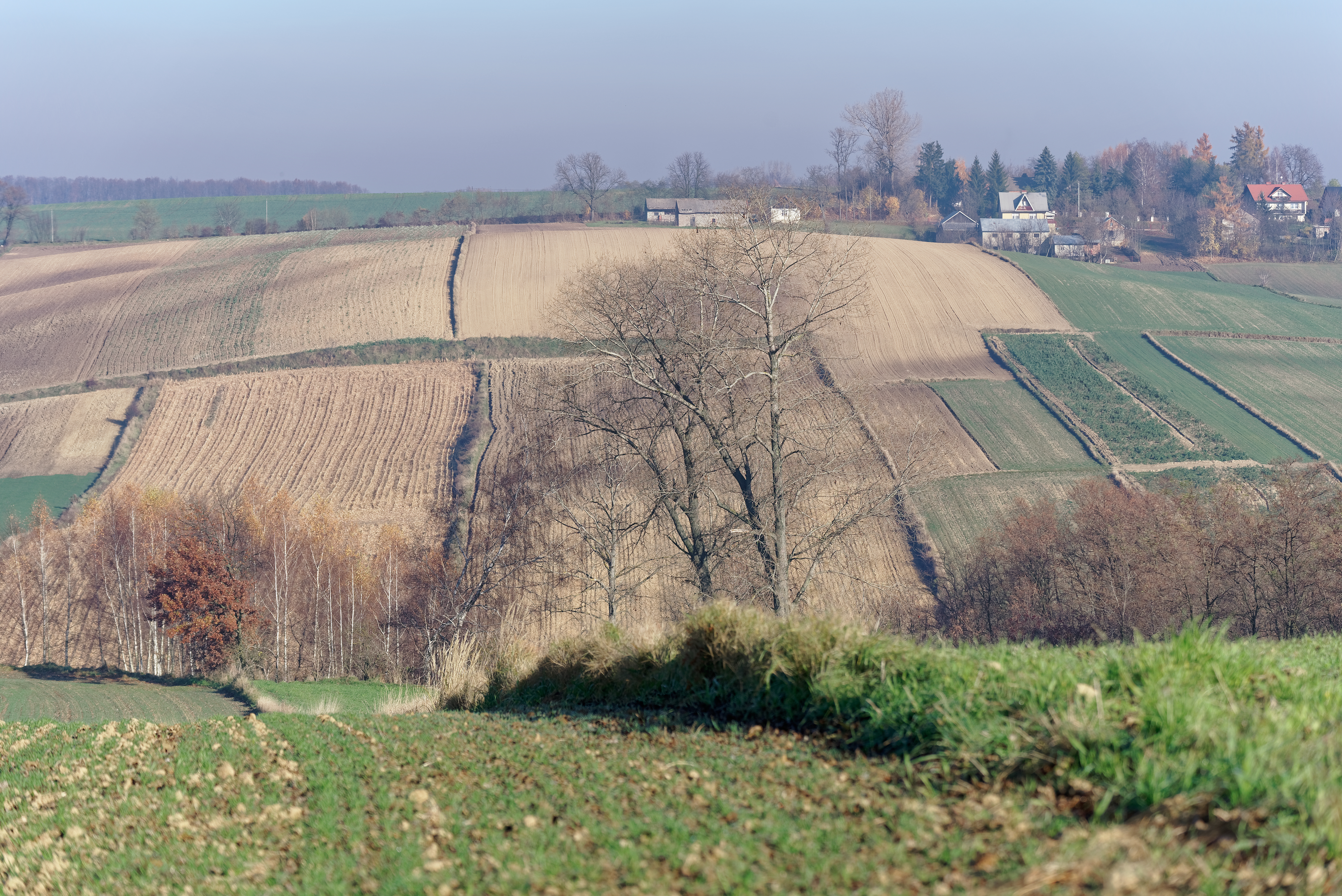

- Location within Poland
- Coordinates: 50°17′06″N 20°15′53″E
- Country: Poland
- Voivodeship: Lesser Poland
- County: Proszowice
- Gmina: Pałecznica

Lelowice-Kolonia [lɛlɔˈvit͡sɛ kɔˈlɔɲa] is a village in the administrative district of Gmina Pałecznica, within Proszowice County, Lesser Poland Voivodeship, in southern Poland.
