= Orthodox Church of the Exaltation of the Holy Cross, Kraków =

Greek Catholic church in Kraków, Poland

Greek Catholic Orthodox Church of the Exaltation of the Holy Cross
- Cerkiew Podwyższenia Krzyża Świętego
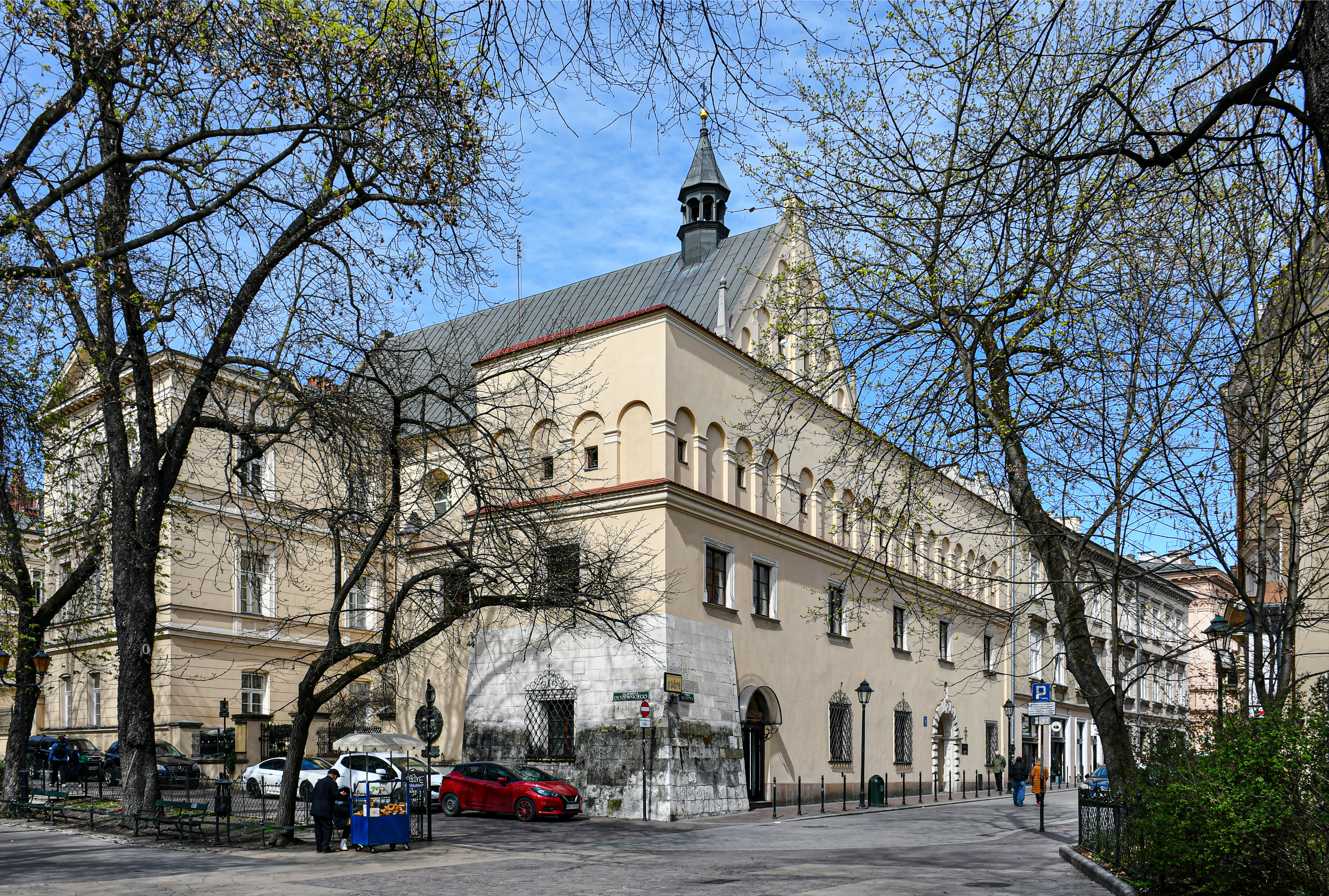
- View from Planty Park
- Greek Catholic Orthodox Church of the Exaltation of the Holy Cross
- 50°03′37.1″N 19°56′03.1″E
- Location: Kraków
- Address: 11 Wiślna Street
- Country: Poland
- Denomination: Greek Catholic
- Website: https://grekokatolicy.pl/grekokatolicy/parafie-ukgk/parafia-greckokatolicka-p-w-podwyzszenia-krzyza-swietego-w-krakowie/

Administration
- Archdiocese: Archeparchy of Przemyśl–Warsaw

UNESCO World Heritage Site
- Type: Cultural
- Criteria: iv
- Designated: 1978
- Part of: Historic Centre of Kraków
- Reference no.: 29
- Region: Europe and North America

Historic Monument of Poland
- Designated: 1994-09-08
- Part of: Kraków historical city complex
- Reference no.: M.P. 1994 nr 50 poz. 418

The Greek Catholic Church of the Exaltation of the Holy Cross (Polish: Cerkiew Podwyższenia Krzyża Świętego) is a historic parish church (tserkov) of the Greek Catholic Church, located at 11 Wiślna Street in the Old Town of Kraków, Poland. It was built between 1636 and 1643 in the Baroque style as the Latin-rite Church of St Norbert, intended for the Norbertine Sisters.

== History ==
The church and monastery was built for the Norbertine Sisters between 1636 and 1643.

After the suppression of religious orders by the Austrian authorities in 1803, the Norbertine nuns left the monastery and the church.

In 1809 it was handed over to the Greek Catholics and became the seat of the Greek Catholic Parish of the Exaltation of the Holy Cross in Kraków. It was owned by Greek Catholics until 1947. From 1949 to 1998 the monastery complex belonged to the Missionaries of La Salette and the church was named after St. Norbert.

In 1998 it was returned to the Greek Catholics and is now once again the Church (Tserkov) of the Exaltation of the Holy Cross.

Currently, it is the seat of the Polish Greek Catholic Parish of the Exaltation of the Holy Cross in Kraków, Archdiocese of Przemyśl-Warsaw, Kraków-Krynica Deanery, Greek Catholic parishes in Poland.

== Architecture ==
Originally a Baroque hall church with a non-separate presbyterium, it was rebuilt several times.

At the end of the 19th century, thanks to the efforts of parish priest Father Ivan Borsuk, a brick iconostasis was erected in the temple, designed by a Polish architect Tadeusz Stryjeński. The icons for this iconostasis were painted by Władysław Rossowski based on a design by Jan Matejko.

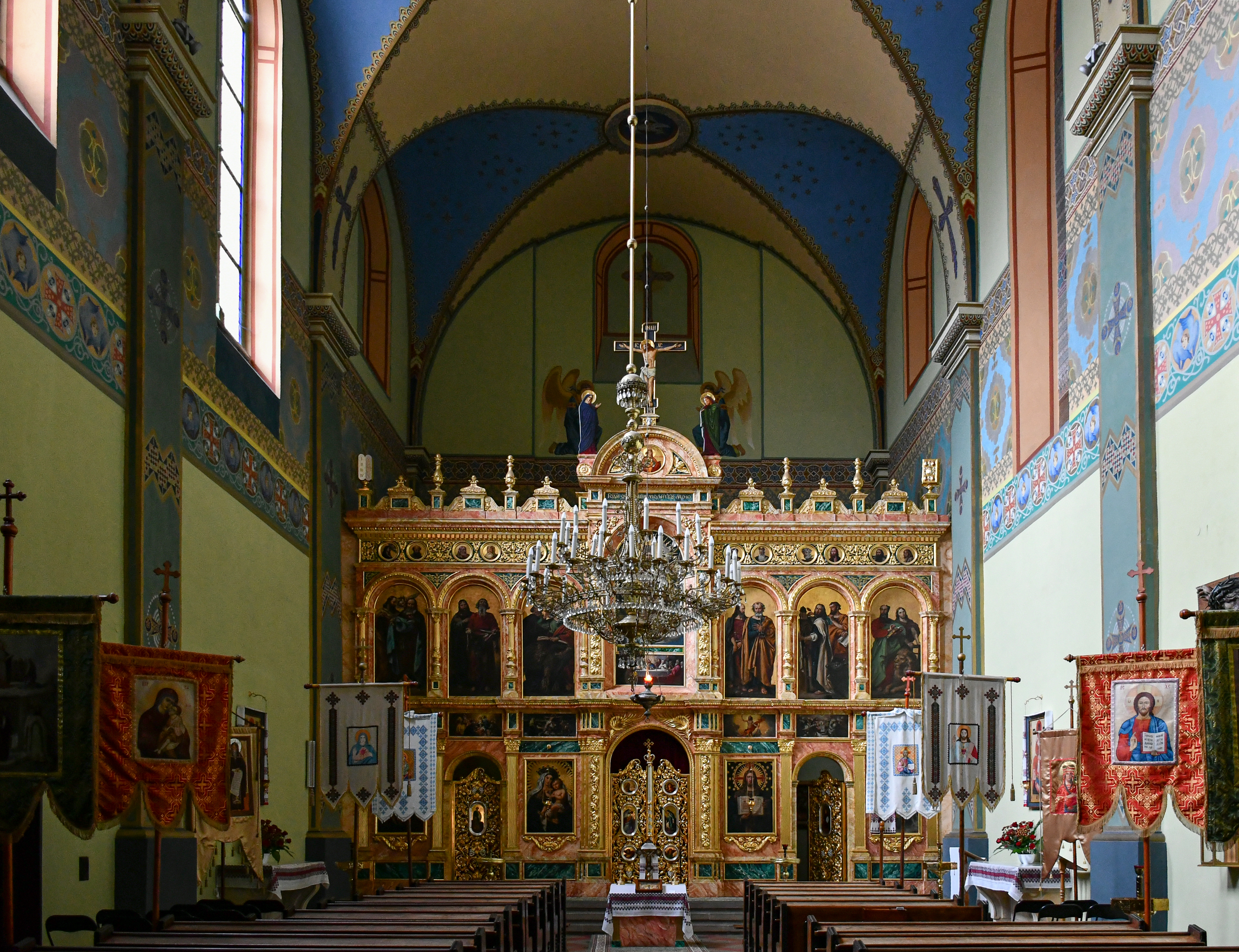
Interior

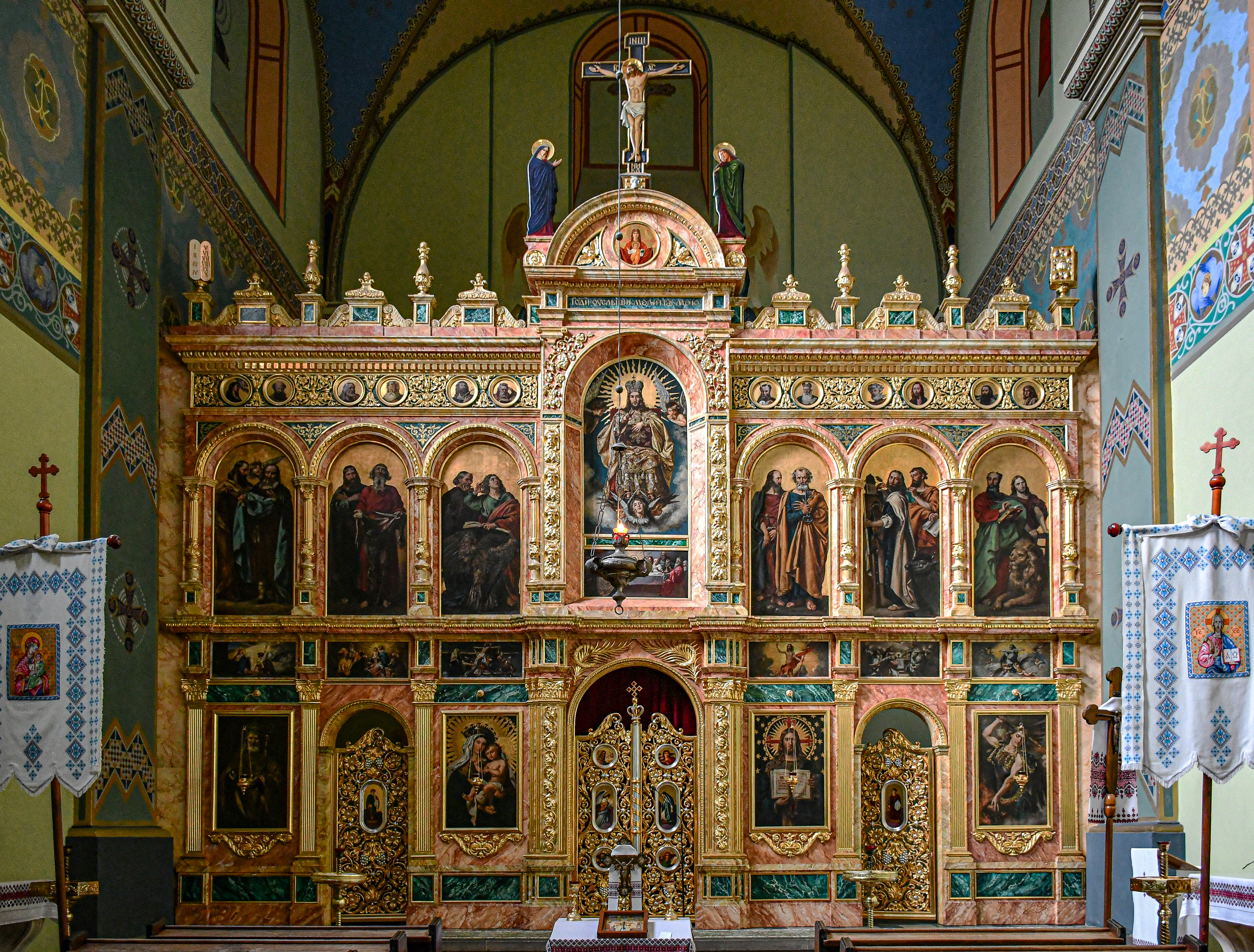
Iconostasis

== Bibliography ==
- (in Polish) Michał Rożek, Barbara Gądkowa Leksykon kościołów Krakowa, Wydawnictwo Verso, Kraków 2003, ISBN 83-919281-0-1 pp 147-148 (Lexicon of Krakow churches)
- (in Polish) Praca zbiorowa Encyklopedia Krakowa, wydawca Biblioteka Kraków i Muzeum Krakowa, Kraków 2023, ISBN 978-83-66253-46-9 volume I pp 752-753 (Encyclopedia of Krakow)
