= Gmina Pałecznica =

Gmina Pałecznica Pałecznica Commune
- Gmina
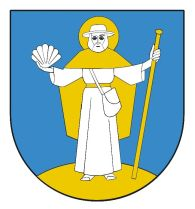
- Coat of arms
- Interactive map of Gmina Pałecznica
- Coordinates (Pałecznica): 50°18′N 20°19′E
- Country: Poland
- Voivodeship: Lesser Poland
- County: Proszowice
- Seat: Pałecznica

Area
  - Total: 47.95 km^{2} (18.51 sq mi)

Population (2006)
  - Total: 3,730
  - Density: 77.8/km^{2} (201/sq mi)
- Website: https://www.palecznica.pl/

Gmina Pałecznica is a rural gmina (administrative district) in Proszowice County, Lesser Poland Voivodeship, in southern Poland. Its seat is the village of Pałecznica, which lies approximately 12 kilometres (7 mi) north of Proszowice and 38 km (24 mi) north-east of the regional capital Kraków.

The gmina covers an area of 47.95 square kilometres (18.5 sq mi), and as of 2006 its total population is 3,730.

== Villages ==
Gmina Pałecznica contains the villages and settlements of Bolów, Czuszów, Gruszów, Ibramowice, Łaszów, Lelowice-Kolonia, Nadzów, Niezwojowice, Pałecznica, Pamięcice, Pieczonogi, Solcza, Sudołek and Winiary.

== Neighbouring gminas ==
Gmina Pałecznica is bordered by the gminas of Kazimierza Wielka, Proszowice, Racławice, Radziemice and Skalbmierz.
