= Neapolitan sums =

The Neapolitan sums (Polish: Sumy neapolitańskie) refers to a loan made in 1557 by Bona Sforza, dowager Queen of Poland and Grand Duchess of Lithuania, to Philip II of Spain. The debt was never repaid and continued to be disputed between the Polish–Lithuanian Commonwealth and Kingdom of Spain up until the Third Partition in 1795. The phrase sumy neapolitańskie became synonymous in the Polish language with empty promises to repay debt.

== Loan and last will ==
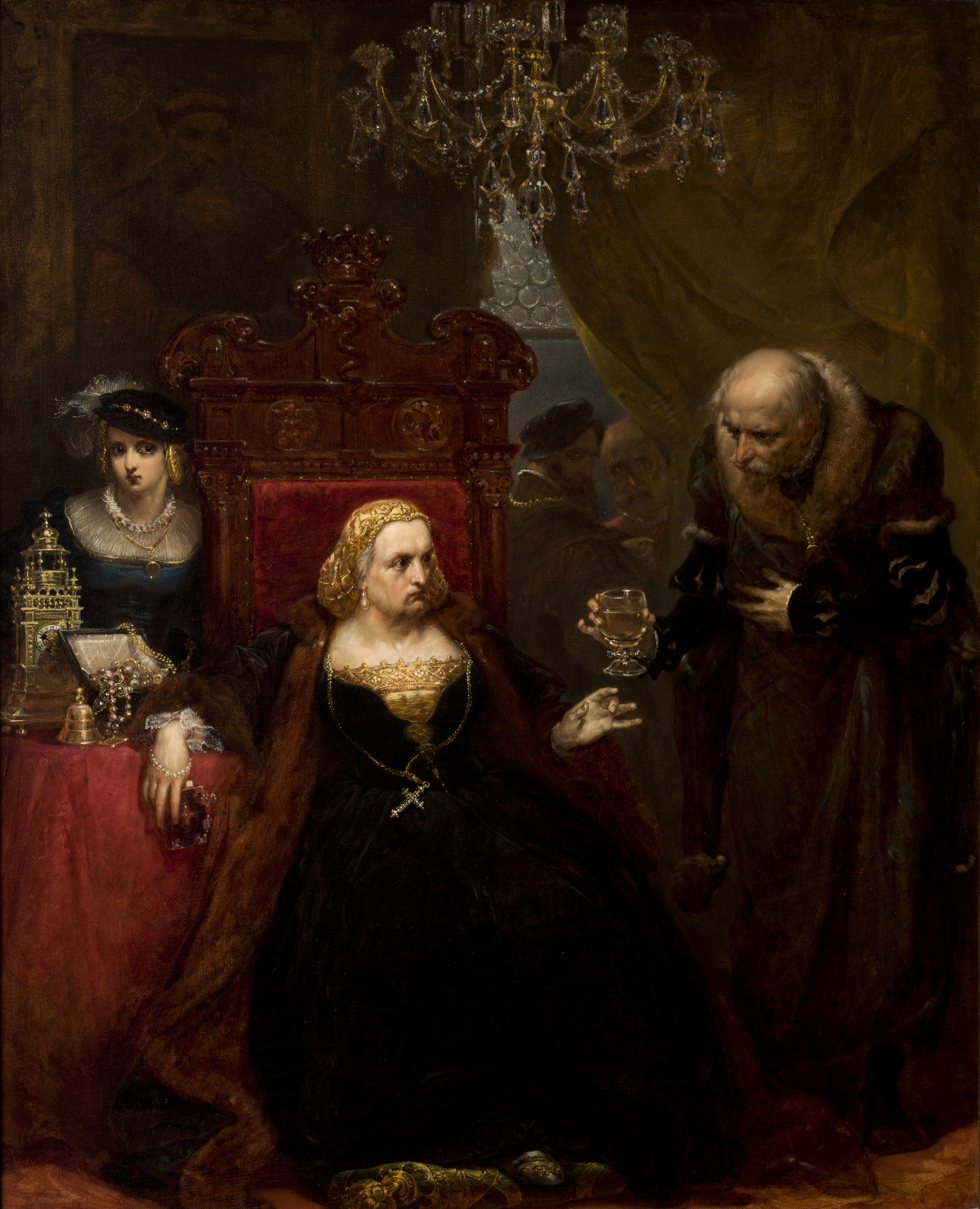
Poisoning of Queen Bona by Jan Matejko. Pappacoda hands Bona a glass of what is supposed to be manna of Saint Nicholas, but in fact is poison.

In February 1556, Bona Sforza departed Poland to her native Italy with treasures she had accumulated in her 38 years in Poland–Lithuania. In May, she arrived in Bari that she inherited from her mother Isabella of Naples. There she was visited by envoys of Philip II of Spain who tried to convince her to give up the Duchy of Bari and Rossano in favor of the Habsburg Spain. She refused, but Fernando Álvarez de Toledo, 3rd Duke of Alba, who at the time was the Viceroy of Naples, feared a French attack and was raising money for troops (see Italian War of 1551–59). Bona, perhaps having ambitions of becoming a Viceroy of Naples herself, agreed to lend him a huge sum of 430,000 ducats at 10% annual interest. The loan was guaranteed by custom duties collected in Foggia. The agreements were signed on 23 September and 5 December 1556.

In 1557, Bona prepared for a journey towards Venice and from there, perhaps, back to Poland; the Habsburgs were determined to obtain Bari and Rossano. On 8 November 1557, Bona became ill with stomach ache. On 17 November, when she was losing her consciousness, her trusted courtier Gian Lorenzo Pappacoda brought notary Marco Vincenzo de Baldis who wrote her last will. This will left Bari, Rossano, Ostuni, and Grottaglie to Philip II of Spain and large sums to Pappacoda and his family. Her daughters would receive a one-time payment of 50,000 ducats, except Isabella Jagiellon who was to receive 10,000 ducats annually. Her only son, King Sigismund II Augustus, was named as the main beneficiary but at the end he would inherit only cash, jewelry, and other personal property. The next day, Bona felt better and dictated a new last will to Scipio Catapani leaving Bari and other property to Sigismund Augustus. She died in the early morning of 19 November 1557. Several of her servants (cook, page, majordomo, scribe) died as well.

== Dispute ==
Pappacoda presented the will that supported Philip II. Sigismund Augustus contested this will and claimed that Pappacoda poisoned Bona and falsified her last will. The Habsburgs claimed that it was Sigismund Augustus who forged the second will. Sigismund Augustus sent Wojciech Kryski to Madrid, Jan Wysocki to Rome, and Marcin Kromer to the court of Ferdinand I, Holy Roman Emperor, who was also Philip's uncle and Sigismund's father-in-law. In connection with the dispute, Sigismund Augustus established the first courier service that connected Kraków with Venice in October 1558. The first royal postmaster was Italian banker Prospero Provana.

Polish envoys faced an uphill battle: Ferdinand I did not want to intervene, claiming to be just a middleman and not a judge, and the case was transferred to a court in Naples. After the Peace of Cateau-Cambrésis, Spain was the dominant power in Italy. Philip's attorneys did not focus on the issue of will's authenticity and instead claimed that Isabella of Naples did not have rights to Bari and Rossano to begin with. Alternatively, they claimed that Bona received Bari only for her lifetime from Charles V, Holy Roman Emperor. Polish envoys did not know the subtleties of Italian and Spanish laws; their work in questioning witnesses and gathering evidence was obstructed by local officials.

The dispute also complicated the relations between Poland and Sweden as 50,000 ducats of the dowry of Catherine Jagiellon was dependent on the successful resolution of the territorial dispute by Sigismund Augustus. Only in July 1559, the Polish managed to recover only a small sum of cash, personal belongings, and interest on the loan. The Duchy of Bari was incorporated into the Spanish Crown, despite requests from Ruy Gómez de Silva and Cardinal Antonio Carafa to grant Bari to them. For his services, Pappacoda was awarded by Philip: he was given a pension and made markgraf of Capurso and castellan of Bari. However, the issue continued to be contested. Cardinal Stanislaus Hosius contemplated about bringing the case before the Council of Trent. Bishop Adam Konarski managed to recover some of Bona's jewelry and more cash. An opportunity to recover Bari and Rossano presented itself when Pope Pius V wanted to include the Polish–Lithuanian Commonwealth in the Holy League in 1571. However, it was lost due to Sigismund Augustus' death in July 1572.

== Repayments ==
Even when paid, the interest payment was late (Spain defaulted on its loans several times). In 1564, Spain paid 300,000 ducats representing interest in arrears. The sum was paid in silver thalers and half-thalers minted in Naples and Sicily. At the time, Poland–Lithuania was engulfed in the Livonian and Northern Seven Years' Wars and was short on cash. To save time and money, the received coins were not melted and re-minted. Instead, they were counterstamped with a monogram of Sigismund Augustus and the year (1564) in Vilnius Mint. These coins were mandatorily exchanged for 60 Polish groszes when in reality the coins were worth only about 33.5 groszes. The King promised to redeem the coins at the end of the war at the same rate of 60 groszes (thus, in effect, providing a wartime loan to the state). It is unknown if the promise was kept. These countersigned coins are numismatic rarity in Poland and Lithuania.

After the death of Sigismund Augustus in 1572, the interest was supposed to be split between his sisters Anna Jagiellon and Catherine Jagiellon. However, Anna did not forward the money to Catherine in Sweden and their conflict became known. The matter of recovering Neapolitan sums was discussed again and again in the general sejm. The issue was often combined with the issue of reopening silver and lead mines in Olkusz that were flooded during the Swedish Deluge. These two matters were often brought up when taxation was discussed as a solution to fiscal issues of the Polish–Lithuanian Commonwealth. It became a proverb that Poland was robbed twice: once by river Baba that flooded Olkusz, and a second time by Queen Bona.

In 2012, Marek Poznański, Polish archaeologist and member of the Sejm, assumed that each ducat had 3.5 grams of 986 gold and calculated that at 2012 gold prices, without interest, the loan was worth 235 million Polish złoty or 57 million euros. The Polish Ministry of Foreign Affairs replied that it was not a loan from the Polish government, but from Bona as an individual. Therefore, if the statute of limitations had not expired, the claim should be pursued by Bona's descendants, of which there are none alive.
