= Winiary, Proszowice County =

Winiary
- Village
- Location within Poland
- Coordinates: 50°18′N 20°20′E
- Country: Poland
- Voivodeship: Lesser Poland
- County: Proszowice
- Gmina: Pałecznica

Winiary [viˈɲarɨ] is a village located in the administrative district of Gmina Pałecznica, within Proszowice County, Lesser Poland Voivodeship, in southern Poland.
