= Ożarowice =

- Village
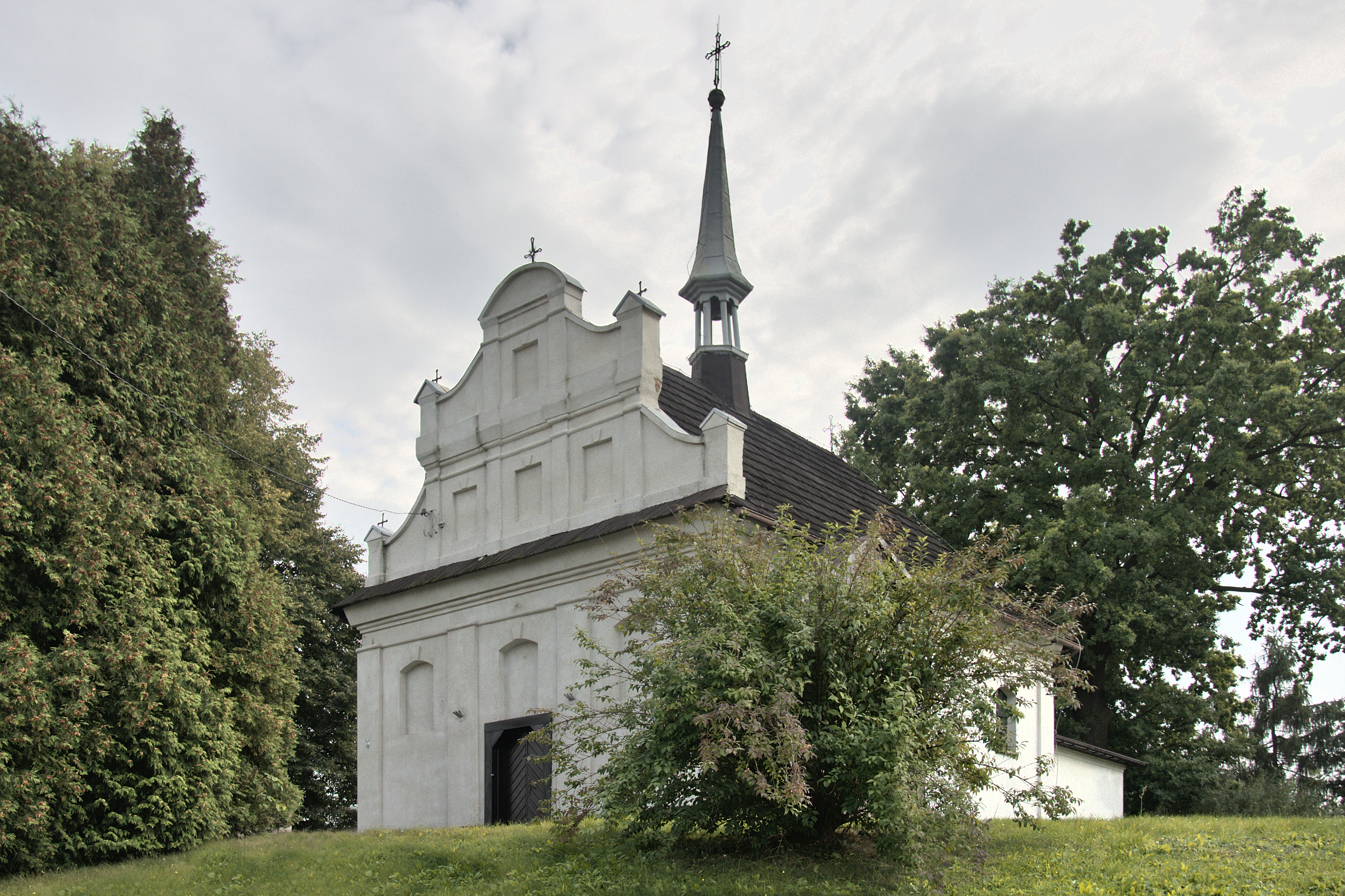
- Church of Saint Barbara

- Location within Poland
- Coordinates: 50°28′N 19°3′E
- Country: Poland
- Voivodeship: Silesian
- County: Tarnowskie Góry
- Gmina: Ożarowice

Population
  - Total: 1,700

Ożarowice [ɔʐarɔˈvit͡sɛ] (Silesian: Ôżarowice) is a village in Tarnowskie Góry County, Silesian Voivodeship, in southern Poland. It is the seat of the gmina (administrative district) called Gmina Ożarowice.
