= Zendek =

- Village
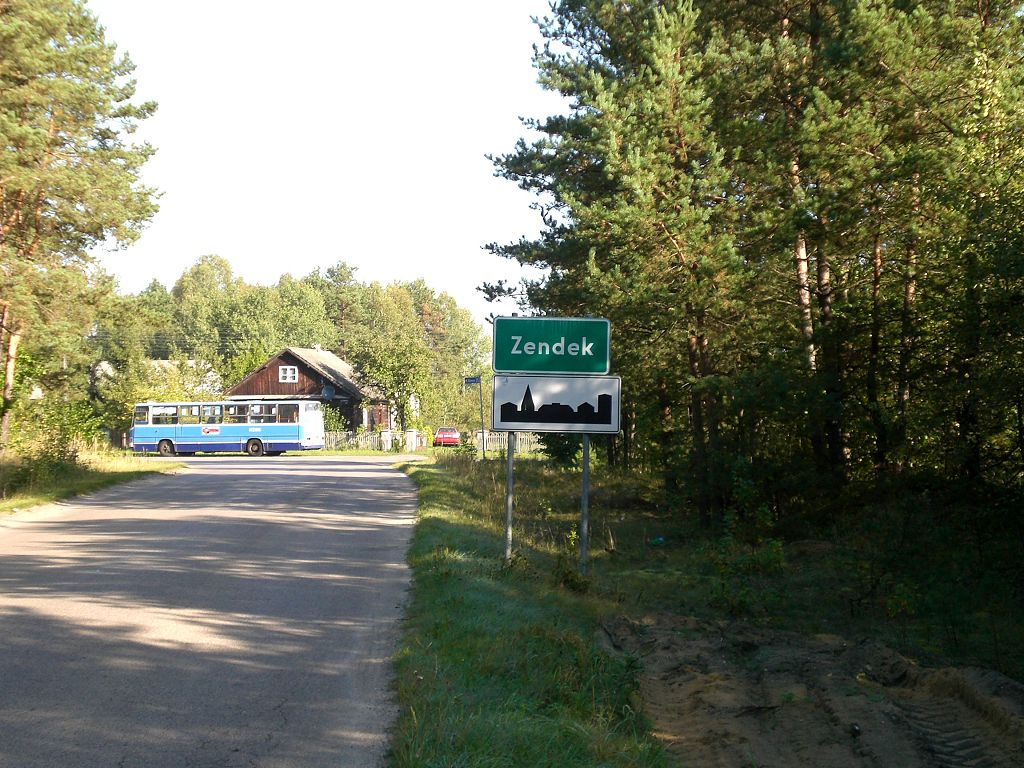

- Location within Poland
- Coordinates: 50°30′N 19°5′E
- Country: Poland
- Voivodeship: Silesian
- County: Tarnowskie Góry
- Gmina: Ożarowice
- Population: 1,000

Zendek [ˈzɛndɛk] is a village in the administrative district of Gmina Ożarowice, within Tarnowskie Góry County, Silesian Voivodeship, in southern Poland.
