= Celiny, Tarnowskie Góry County =

Celiny
- Village
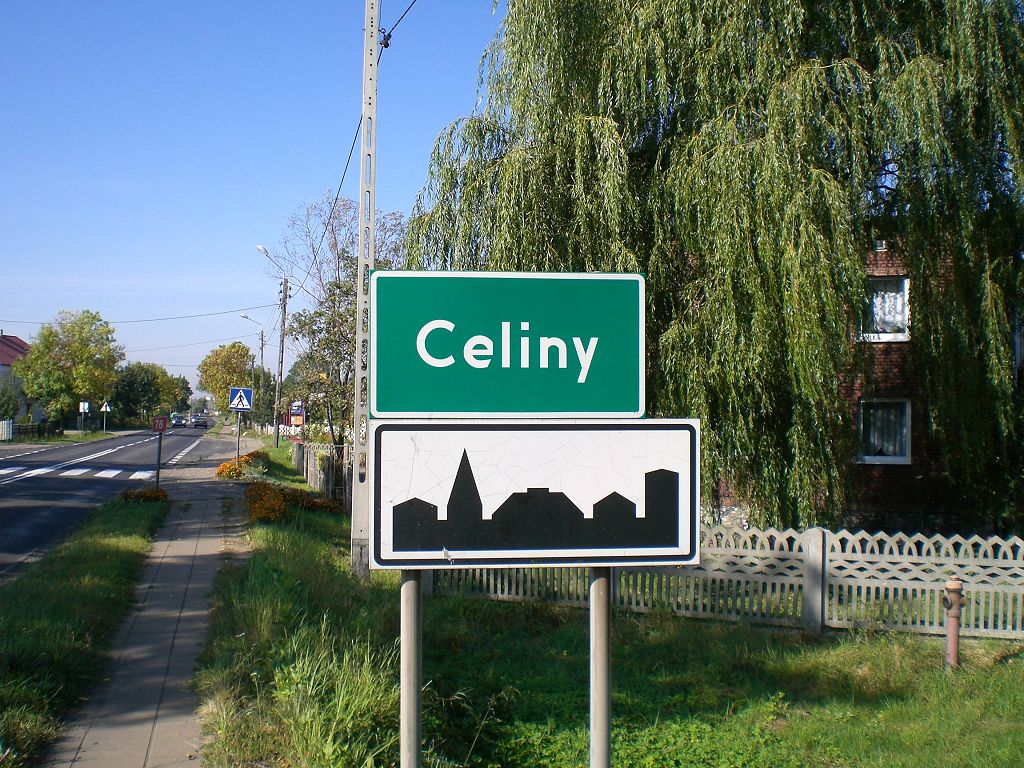
- Nameplate at the entrance to Celiny on the National Road 78

- Location within Poland
- Coordinates: 50°26′N 19°3′E
- Country: Poland
- Voivodeship: Silesian
- County: Tarnowskie Góry
- Gmina: Ożarowice

Population
  - Total: 260
- Time zone: UTC+1 (CET)
  - Summer (DST): UTC+2 (CEST)
- Vehicle registration: STA

Celiny [t͡sɛˈlinɨ] is a village in the administrative district of Gmina Ożarowice, within Tarnowskie Góry County, Silesian Voivodeship, in southern Poland.

== History ==
In 1827 Celiny had a population of 41, which by the late 19th century grew to 109.

During the German occupation of Poland (World War II), in 1940, the Germans carried out a massacre of 29 Poles, merchants, miners, craftsmen and workers from various nearby cities, in Celiny (see Nazi crimes against the Polish nation).
