= Ossy =

- Village
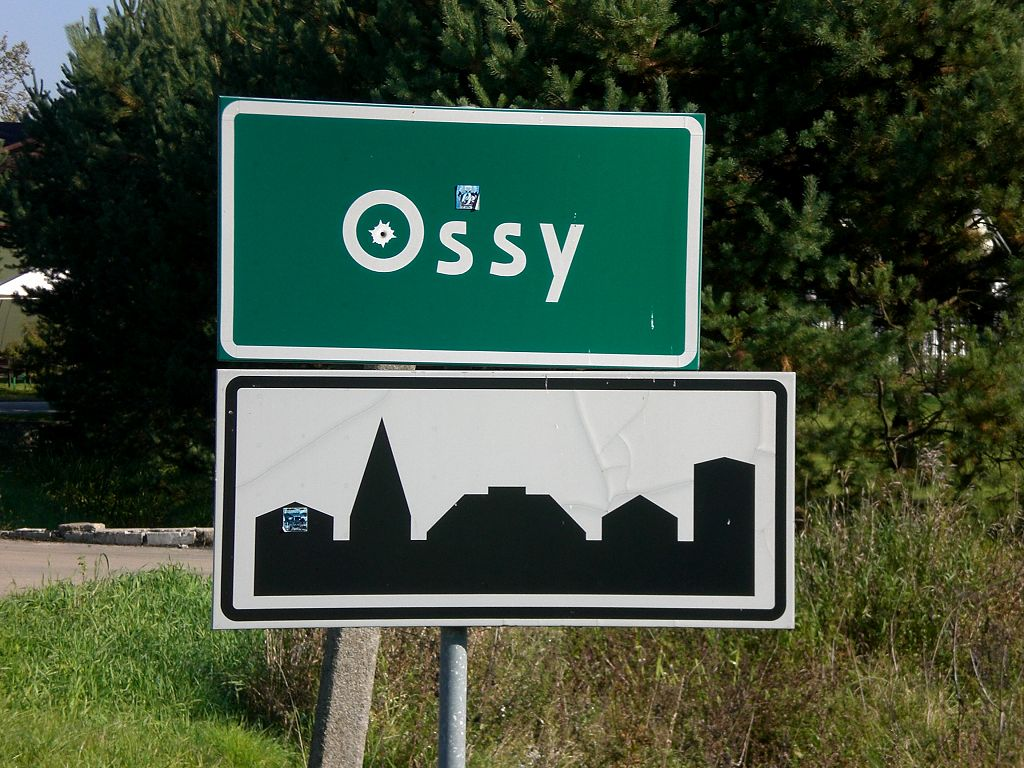

- Location within Poland
- Coordinates: 50°26′N 19°0′E
- Country: Poland
- Voivodeship: Silesian
- County: Tarnowskie Góry
- Gmina: Ożarowice
- Population: 500

Ossy [ˈɔssɨ] is a village in the administrative district of Gmina Ożarowice, within Tarnowskie Góry County, Silesian Voivodeship, in southern Poland.
