= Solcza =

- Village
- Location within Poland
- Coordinates: 50°19′N 20°18′E
- Country: Poland
- Voivodeship: Lesser Poland
- County: Proszowice
- Gmina: Pałecznica

Solcza [ˈsɔlt͡ʂa] is a village in the administrative district of Gmina Pałecznica, within Proszowice County, Lesser Poland Voivodeship, in southern Poland.
