= Pyrzowice =

- Village
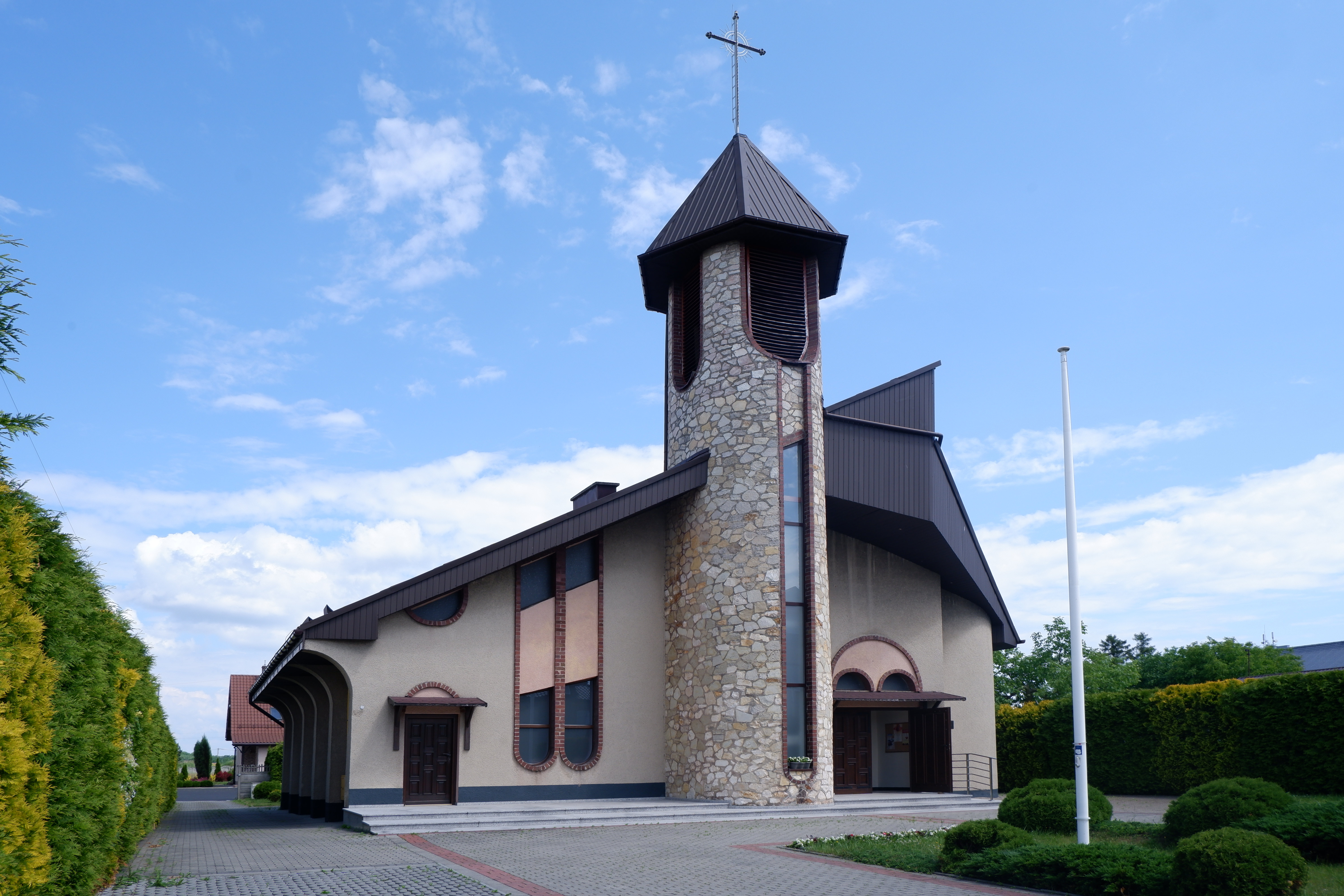
- Church of the Visitation of Blessed Virgin Mary

- Location within Poland
- Coordinates: 50°28′N 19°4′E
- Country: Poland
- Voivodeship: Silesian
- County: Tarnowskie Góry
- Gmina: Ożarowice
- Elevation: 300 m (980 ft)

Population
  - Total: 980

Pyrzowice [pɨʐɔˈvit͡sɛ] is a village in the administrative district of Gmina Ożarowice, within Tarnowskie Góry County, Silesian Voivodeship, in southern Poland. The Katowice International Airport is located nearby.

Pyrzowice belongs to Zagłębie Dąbrowskie, part of historic province of Lesser Poland. The village was first mentioned in 1340, and for centuries, it was part of the Duchy of Siewierz, property of bishops of Kraków. Originally, Pyrzowice was owned by Norbertine nuns from Kraków. Across centuries, it changed hands several times. After the Partitions of Poland, since 1815 it belonged to Russian-controlled Congress Poland, and in 1918 it returned to Poland, as part of Kielce Voivodeship. In 1940, German occupiers opened an air base in the village of Zendek, which would later become Katowice International Airport.
