= Tąpkowice =

- Village
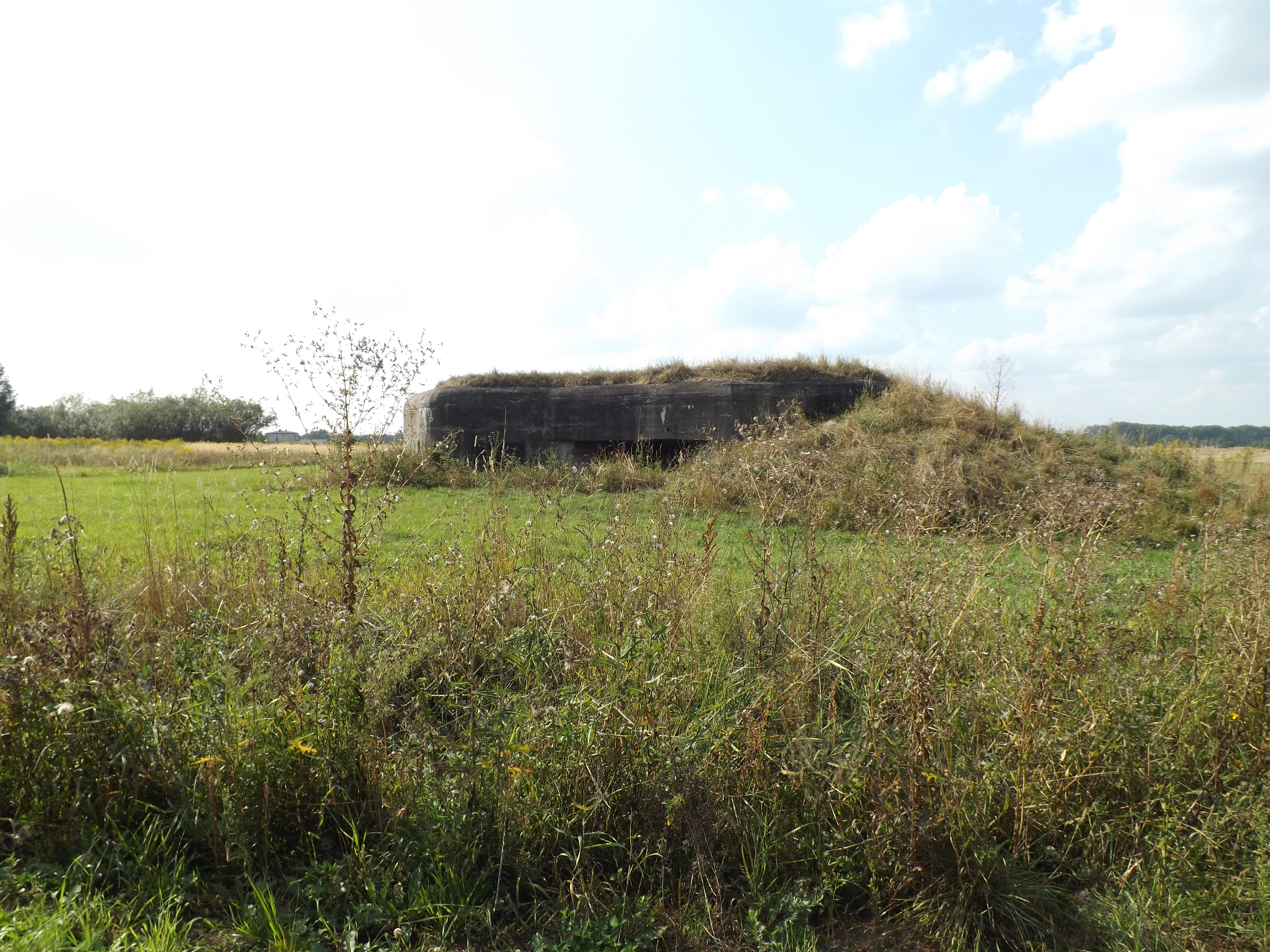
- Bunker

- Location within Poland
- Coordinates: 50°26′57″N 19°0′56″E
- Country: Poland
- Voivodeship: Silesian
- County: Tarnowskie Góry
- Gmina: Ożarowice
- Population: 1,000

Tąpkowice [tɔmpkɔˈvit͡sɛ] is a village in the administrative district of Gmina Ożarowice, within Tarnowskie Góry County, Silesian Voivodeship, in southern Poland.
