= Szewska Street, Kraków =

Street in Kraków, Poland

Szewska Street
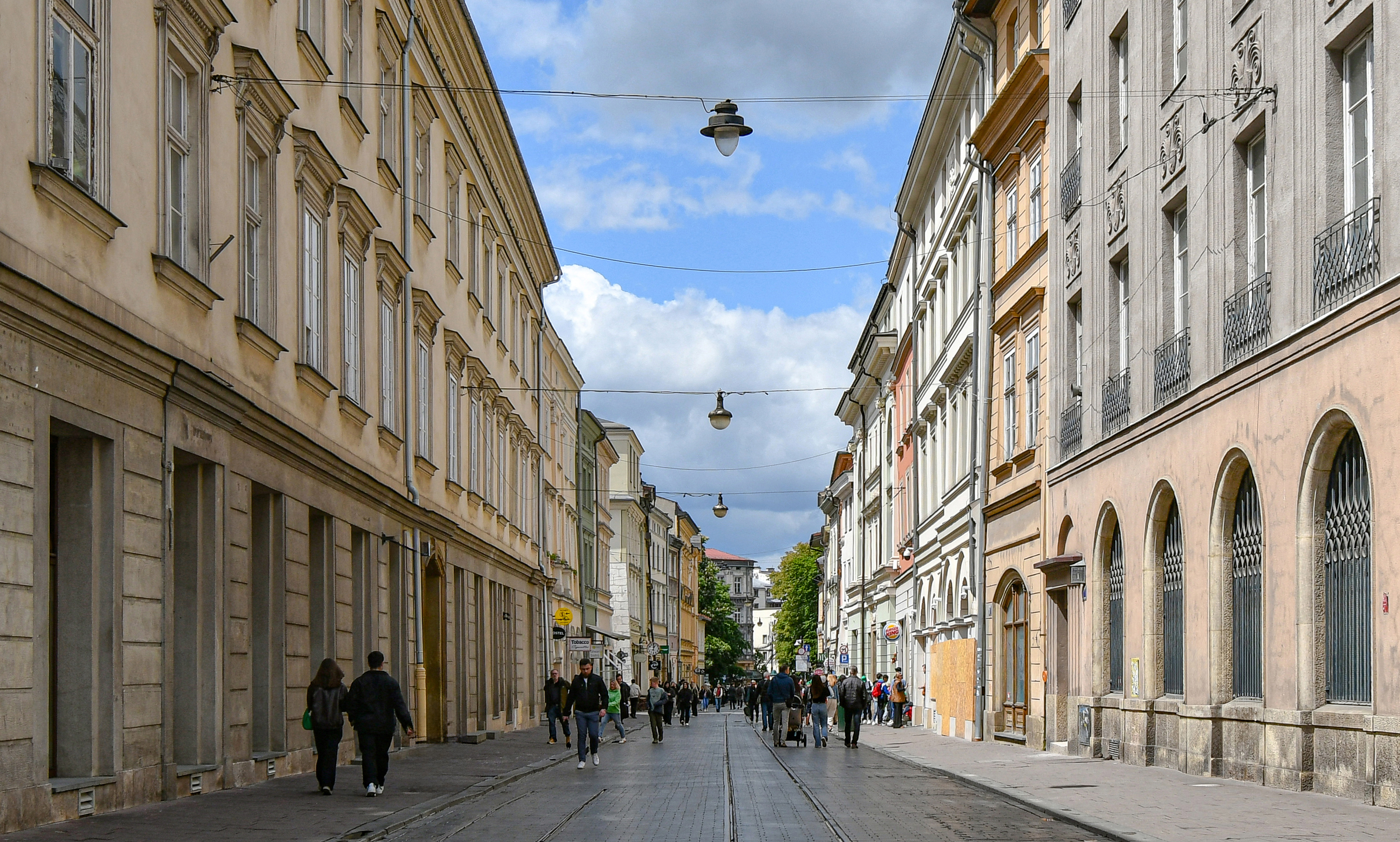
- View from Main Market Square to the west

- Length: 270 m (890 ft)
- West end: Podwale Street
- East end: Main Square

UNESCO World Heritage Site
- Type: Cultural
- Criteria: iv
- Designated: 1978
- Part of: Historic Centre of Kraków
- Reference no.: 29
- Region: Europe and North America

Historic Monument of Poland
- Designated: 1994-09-08
- Part of: Kraków historical city complex
- Reference no.: M.P. 1994 nr 50 poz. 418

Szewska Street (Polish: Ulica Szewska, lit. Shoemakers Street) - a historic street in Kraków, Poland. The street begins at the Main Square from which it heads west, where it adjoins Podwale Street. Formerly, where Szewska met with Podwale Street stood the former suburb of Garbary with gristmills and royal fulling houses. Most of the street's buildings were built between the fourteenth and seventeenth-century. Szewska Street was part of the former Silesian Route (heading towards Bytom). The street continues west as Karmelicka Street (Ulica Karmelicka, lit. Carmelites Street).

== Features ==
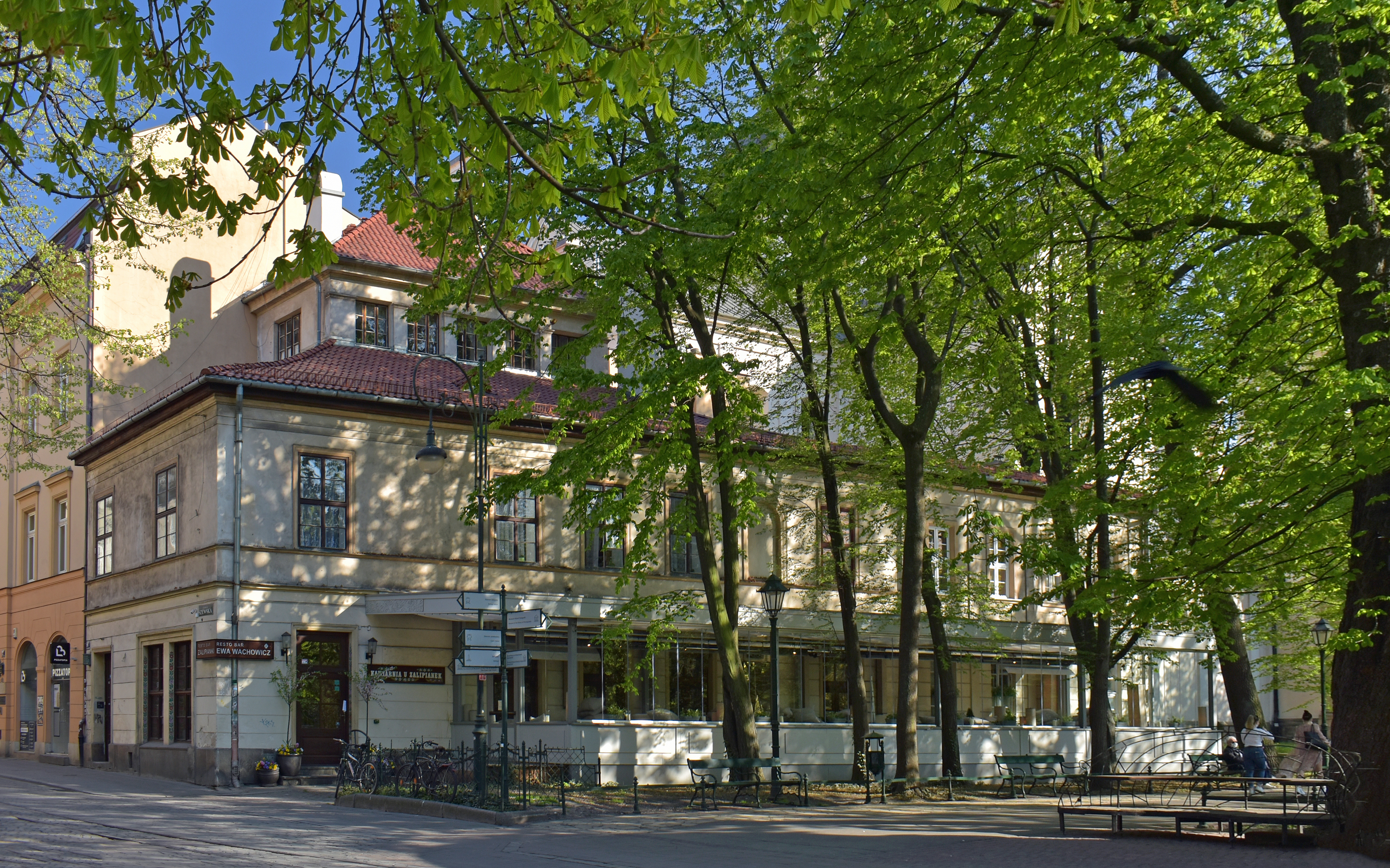
Street No.	Short description	Picture
24	Kantorowska House - a Classicist building, which between 1977 and 2014 housed the traditional U Zalipianek restaurant. The building's interior is decorated with folk art, designed by artists from the village of Zalipie.
