= Jan Ptaśnik =

Polish historian

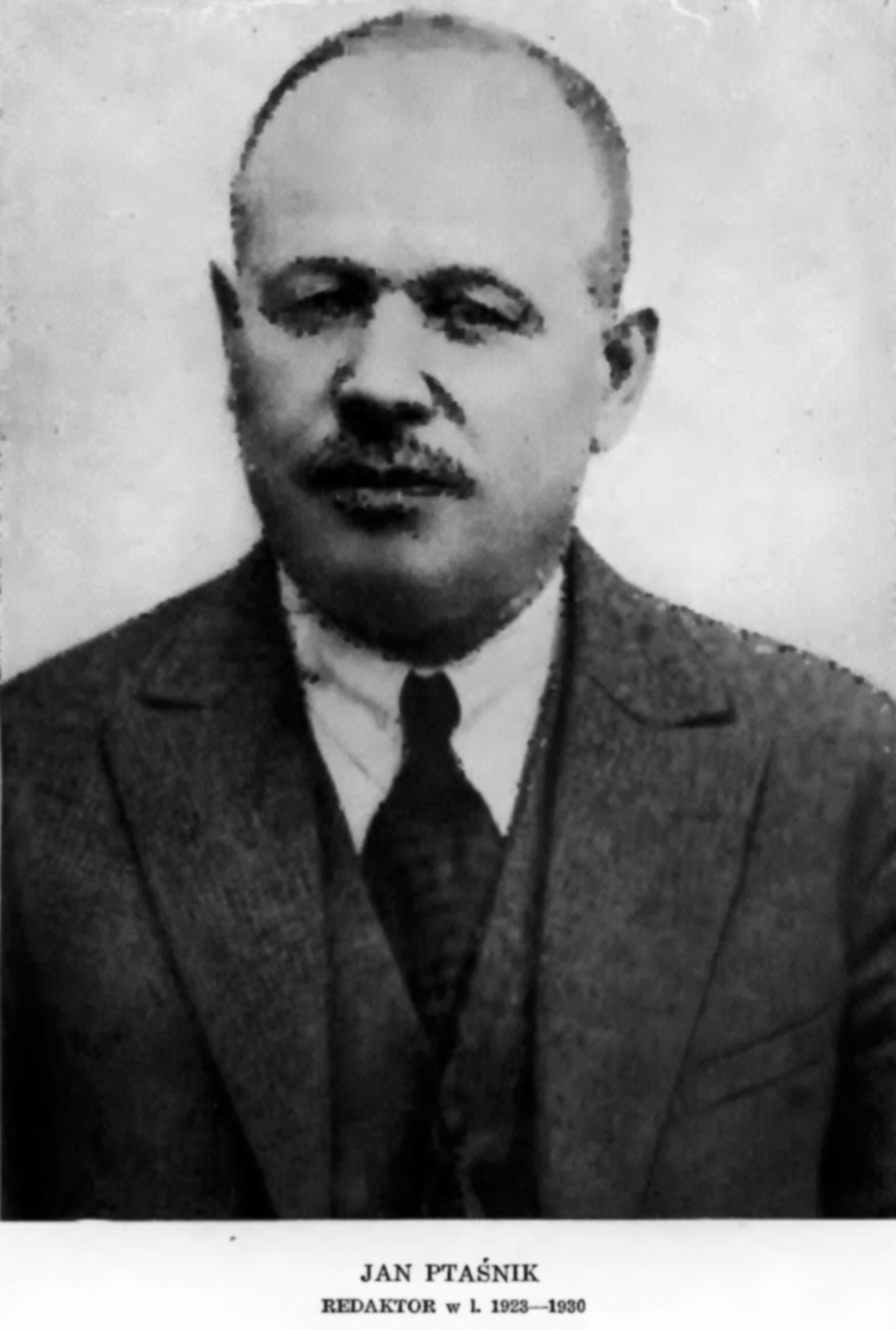
- Born: January 15, 1876; Mikluszowice
- Died: February 22, 1930 (aged 54); Lviv
- Education: Doctoral degree
- Alma mater: Jagiellonian University
- Occupations: Historian, professor

Jan Ptaśnik (1876 – 1930) was a Polish historian of medieval and urban history. His work focused heavily on documenting Italian influence in Poland.

== Biography ==
Ptaśnik was born into the peasantry in 1876 near Bochnia. According to historian Wiesław Bieńkowski writing in the Polish Biographical Dictionary, the initial expectation for Ptaśnik was the priesthood. However, Ptaśnik received his education at the gymnasium in Bochnia and at Jagiellonian University, receiving a doctoral degree from the latter in 1903. Ptaśnik then went to Rome to study art, archeology, and diplomatic history. He was made associate professor at Jagiellonian University in 1919. In the 1920s, he became a dean at the University of Lviv.

During his career, Ptaśnik authored multiple books and edited the Monumenta Poloniae Vaticana from 1913.

Ptaśnik died in 1930 after a surgical operation.

== Works ==
- (1922) Kultura włoska wieków średnich w Polsce, trans. The Italian Medieval Civilization in Poland
- (1925) The Religious Life

== Legacy ==
- Professor Jaroslav Miller considers Ptaśnik to be a pioneer in the field of urban history.
- Historian Meir Balaban critiqued Ptaśnik's portrayal of Jews in Poland.
