= Nadzów =

- Village
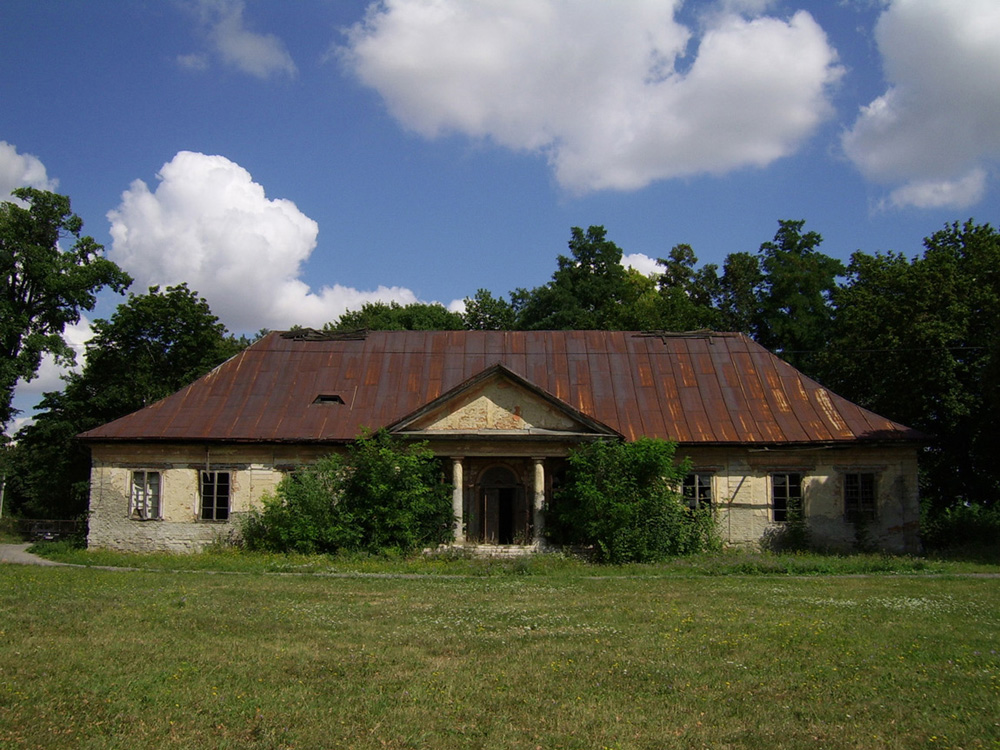
- Manor house

- Location within Poland
- Coordinates: 50°15′N 20°19′E
- Country: Poland
- Voivodeship: Lesser Poland
- County: Proszowice
- Gmina: Pałecznica

Nadzów [ˈnad͡zuf] is a village in the administrative district of Gmina Pałecznica, within Proszowice County, Lesser Poland Voivodeship, in southern Poland.

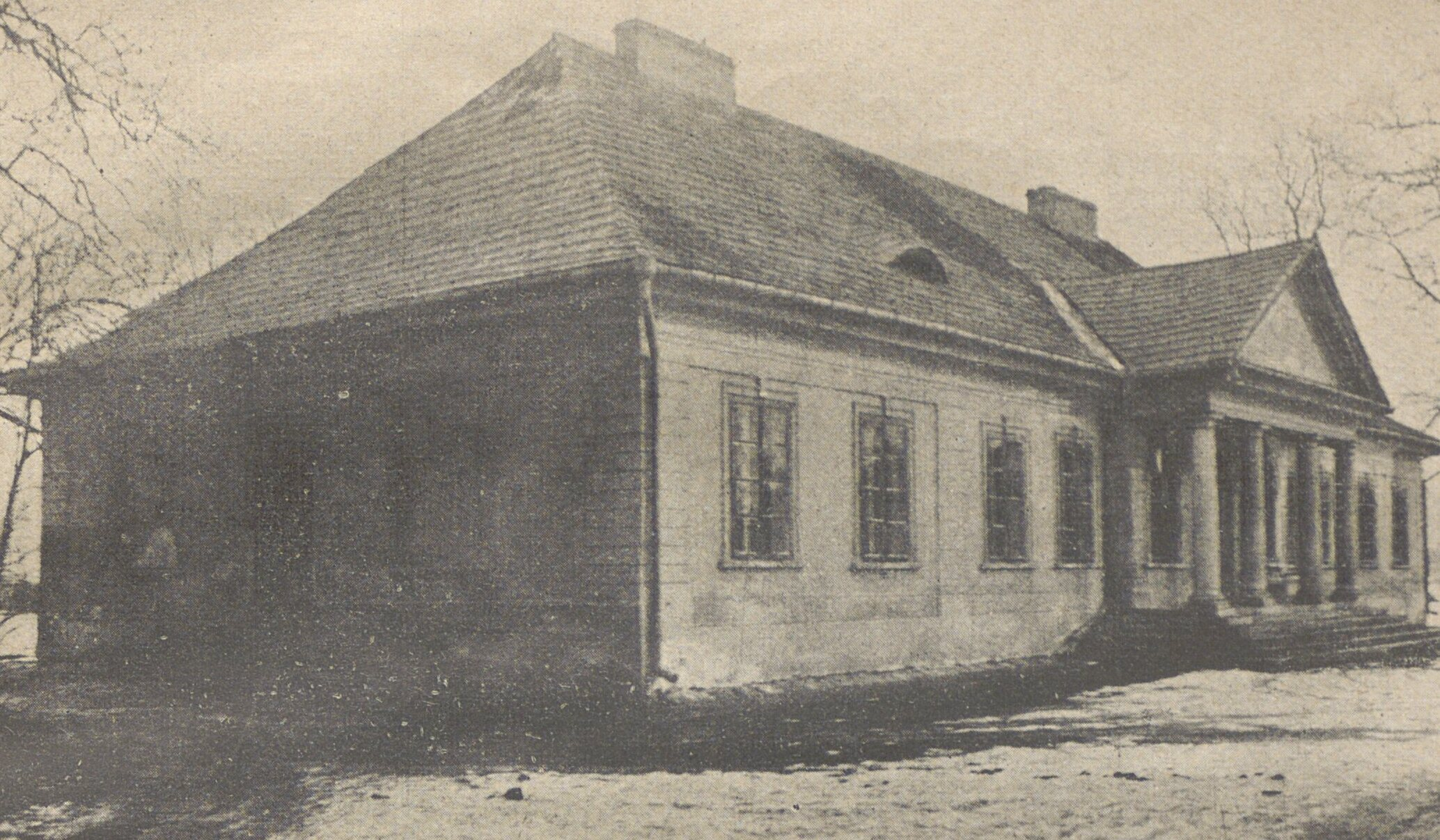
Manor house, before 1925
