= Pałecznica, Lesser Poland Voivodeship =

Pałecznica
- Village
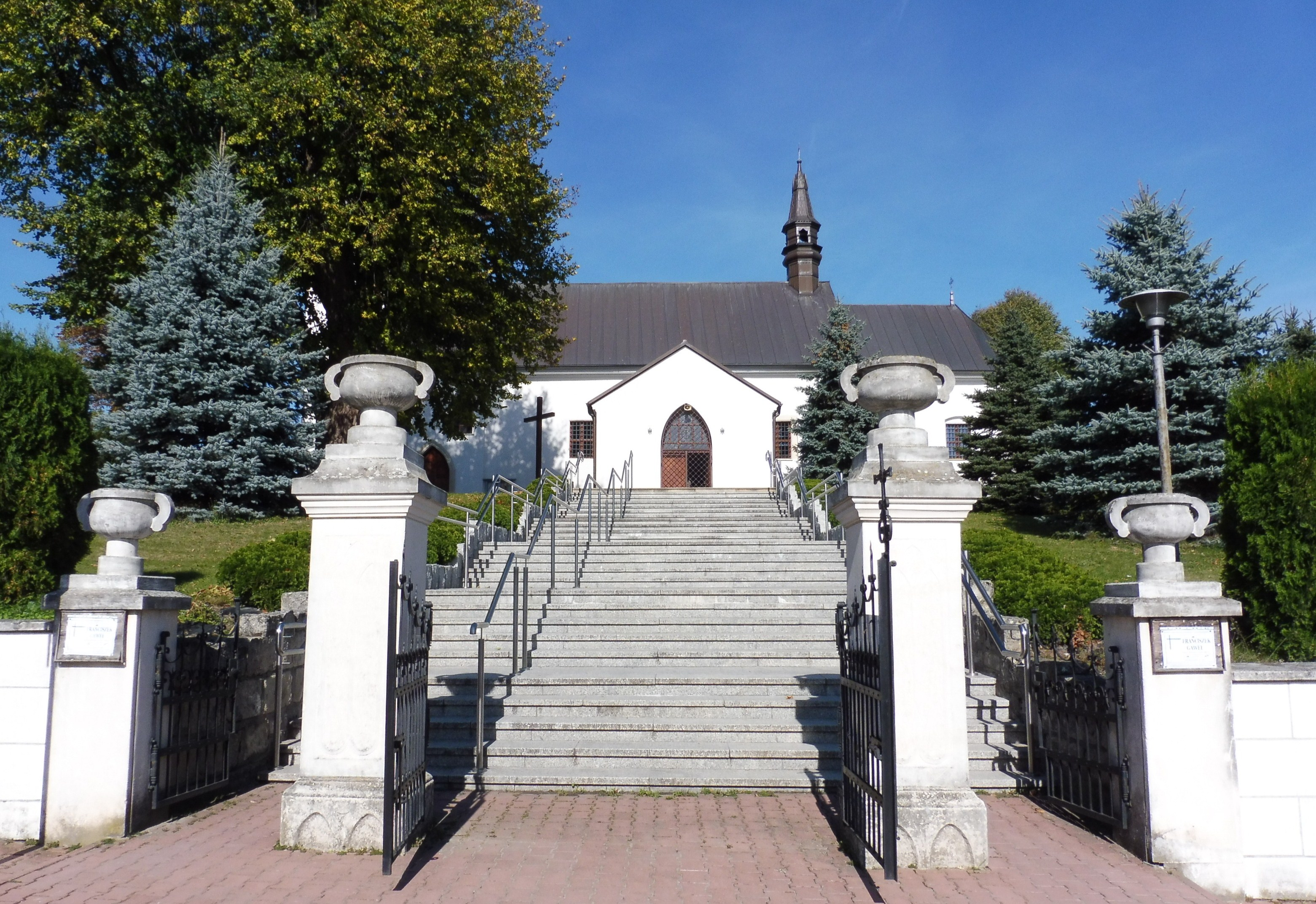
- Church of Saint James, the Apostle

- Location within Poland
- Coordinates: 50°18′N 20°19′E
- Country: Poland
- Voivodeship: Lesser Poland
- County: Proszowice
- Gmina: Pałecznica

Pałecznica [pawɛt͡ʂˈnit͡sa] is a village in Proszowice County, Lesser Poland Voivodeship, in southern Poland. It is the seat of the gmina (administrative district) called Gmina Pałecznica.

== See also ==
- Lesser Polish Way
