= Sudołek =

- Village
- Location within Poland
- Coordinates: 50°16′N 20°18′E
- Country: Poland
- Voivodeship: Lesser Poland
- County: Proszowice
- Gmina: Pałecznica

Sudołek [suˈdɔwɛk] is a village in the administrative district of Gmina Pałecznica, within Proszowice County, Lesser Poland Voivodeship, in southern Poland.
