= Wiślna Street, Kraków =

Street in Kraków, Poland

Wiślna Street
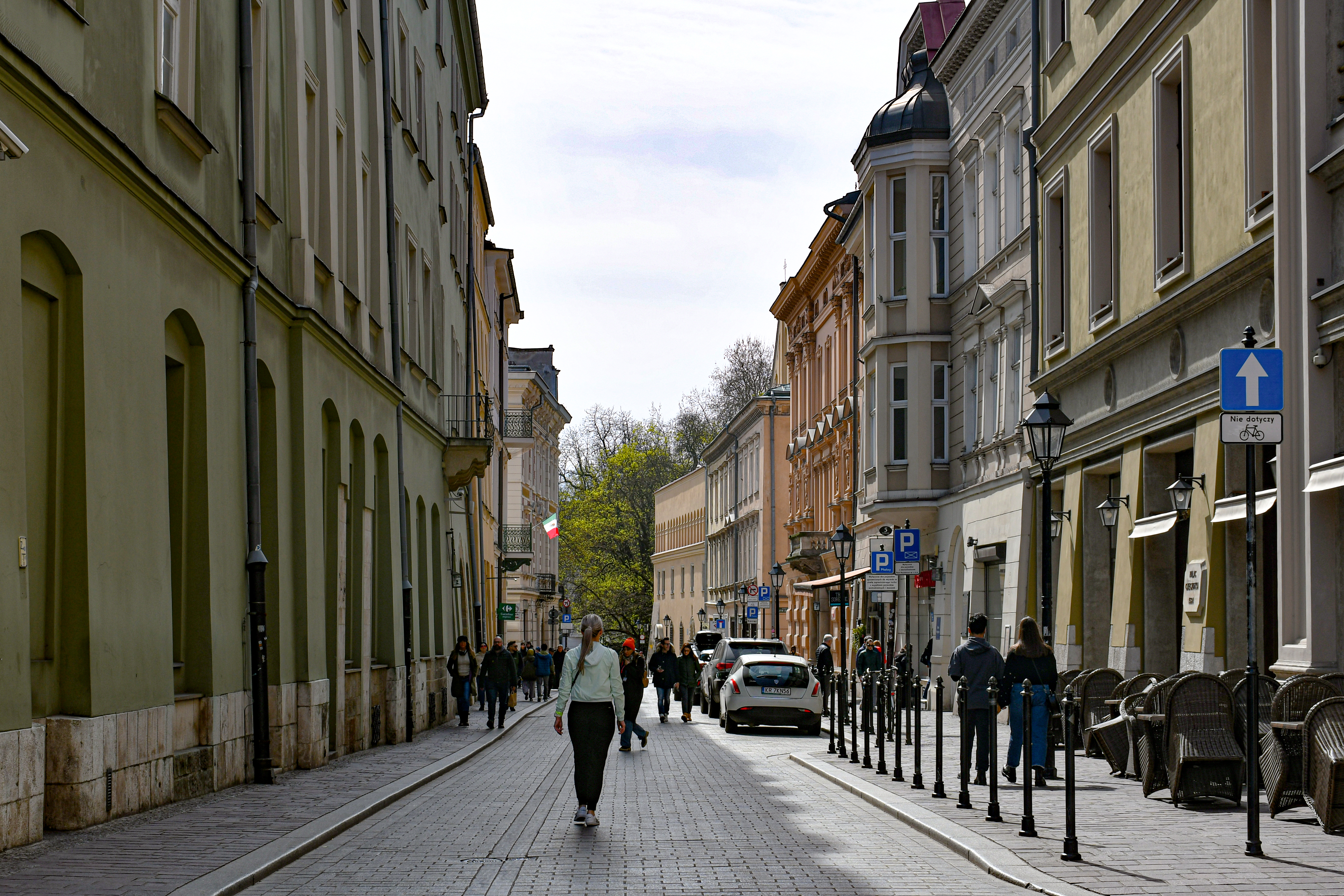
- View from Main Market Square (2025)

- Native name: ulica Wiślna (Polish)
- Length: 170 m (560 ft)
- Coordinates: 50.060765°N 19.934939°E
- Southwest end: Planty Park; Zwierzyniecka Street
- Northeast end: Main Market Square

UNESCO World Heritage Site
- Type: Cultural
- Criteria: iv
- Designated: 1978
- Part of: Historic Centre of Kraków
- Reference no.: 29
- Region: Europe and North America

Historic Monument of Poland
- Designated: 1994-09-08
- Part of: Kraków historical city complex
- Reference no.: M.P. 1994 nr 50 poz. 418

Wiślna Street (Polish: Ulica Wiślna, lit. Vistulan Street) is a historic street in the Old Town of Kraków, Poland.

The street runs from the Main Square towards the River Vistula, and extends southwards as Zwierzyniecka Street.

== Features ==
- 1 Wiślna Street - a Renaissance townhouse built in 1561 according to architects Gabriel Słoński and Ambroży Moroś's designs. The third floor was built in the nineteenth century.
- 11 Wiślna Street - Greek Catholic orthodox Church (Tserkov) of the Exaltation of the Holy Cross.
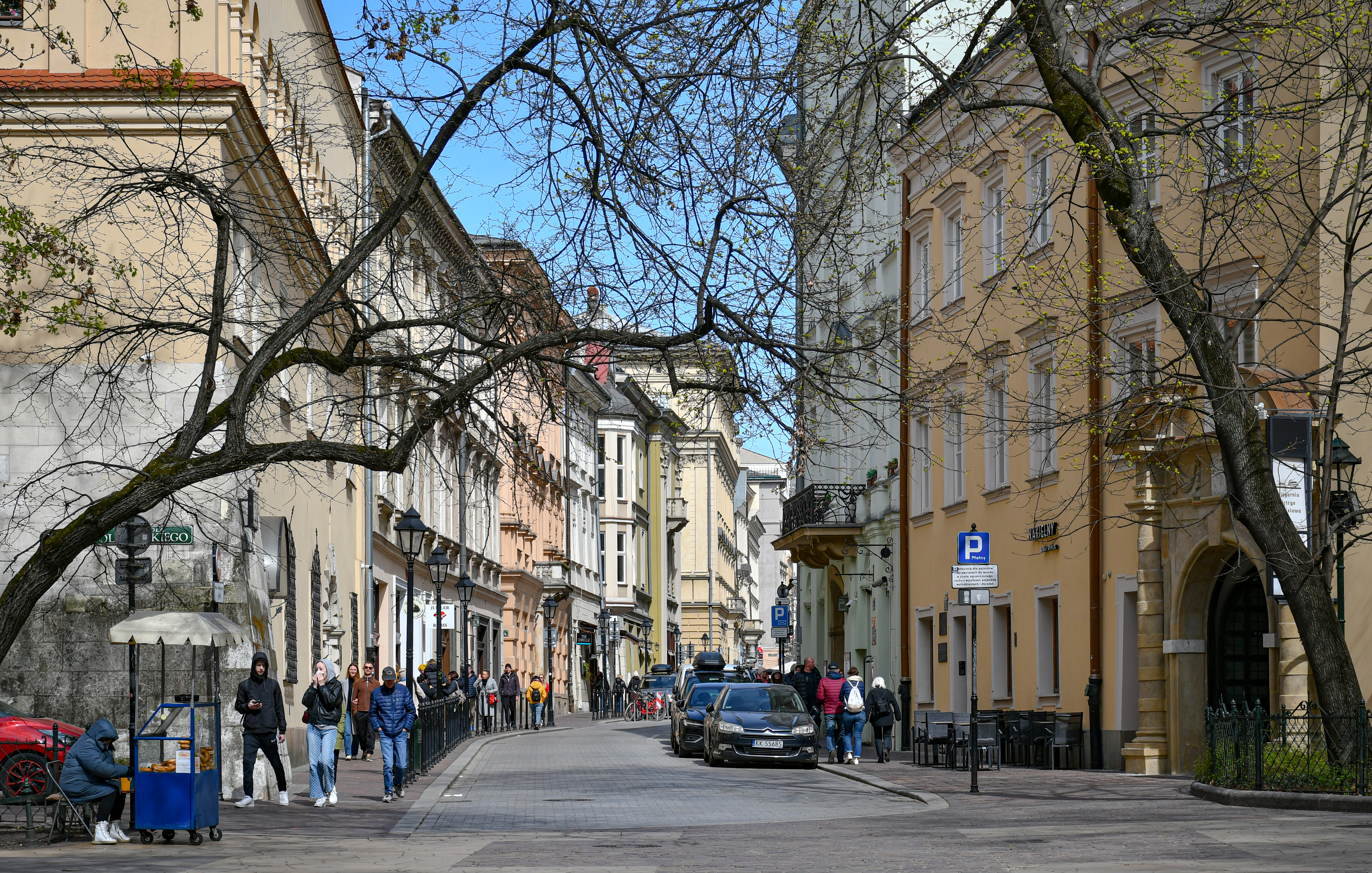
View from Planty Park.

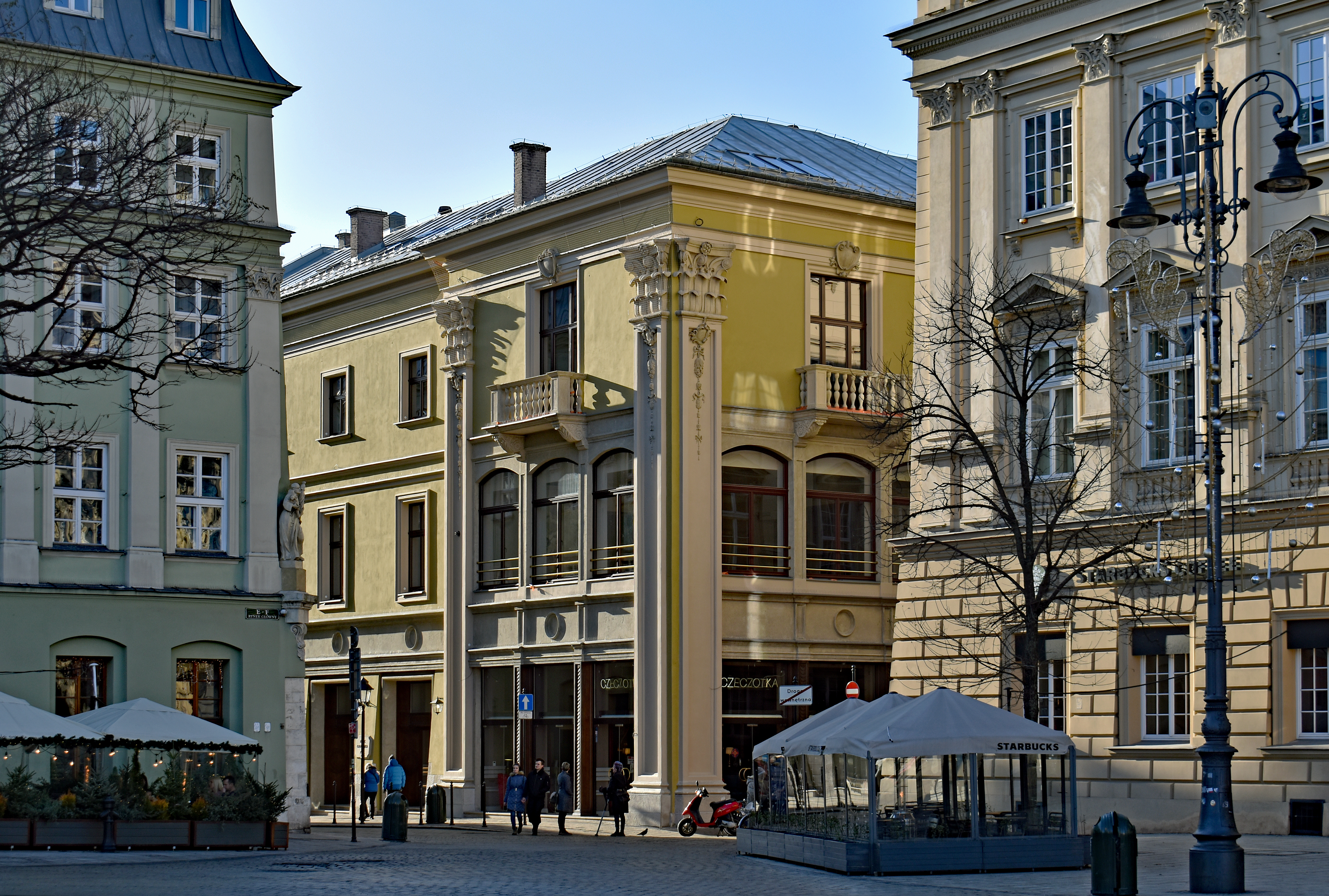
1 Wiślna Street
Czeczotka tenement house.

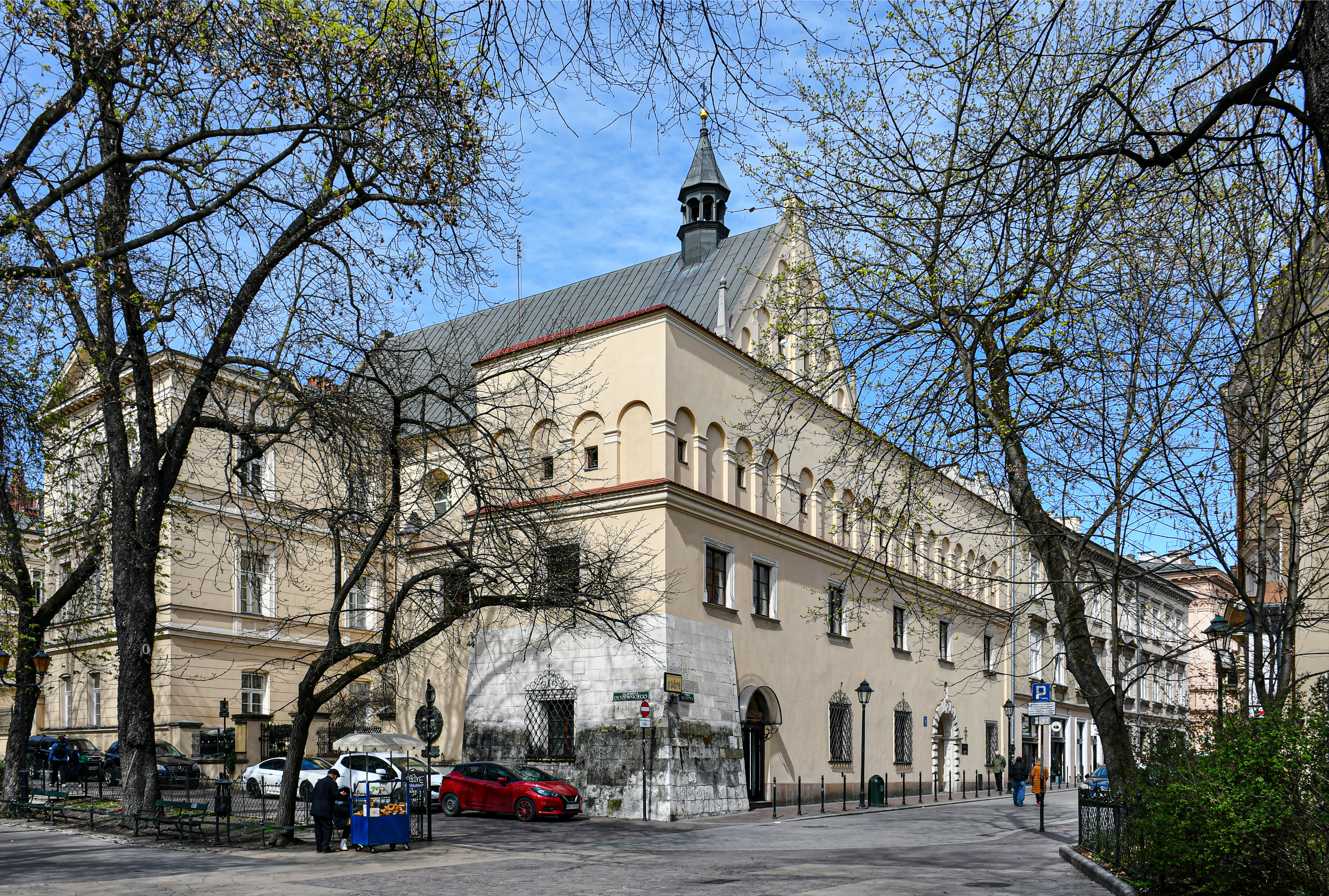
11 Wiślna Street
Greek Catholic Tserkov.
