= Gruszów, Gmina Pałecznica =

Gruszów
- Village
- Location within Poland
- Coordinates: 50°15′47″N 20°16′26″E
- Country: Poland
- Voivodeship: Lesser Poland
- County: Proszowice
- Gmina: Pałecznica

Gruszów [ˈɡruʂuf] is a village in the administrative district of Gmina Pałecznica, within Proszowice County, Lesser Poland Voivodeship, in southern Poland.
