= Sączów =

- Village
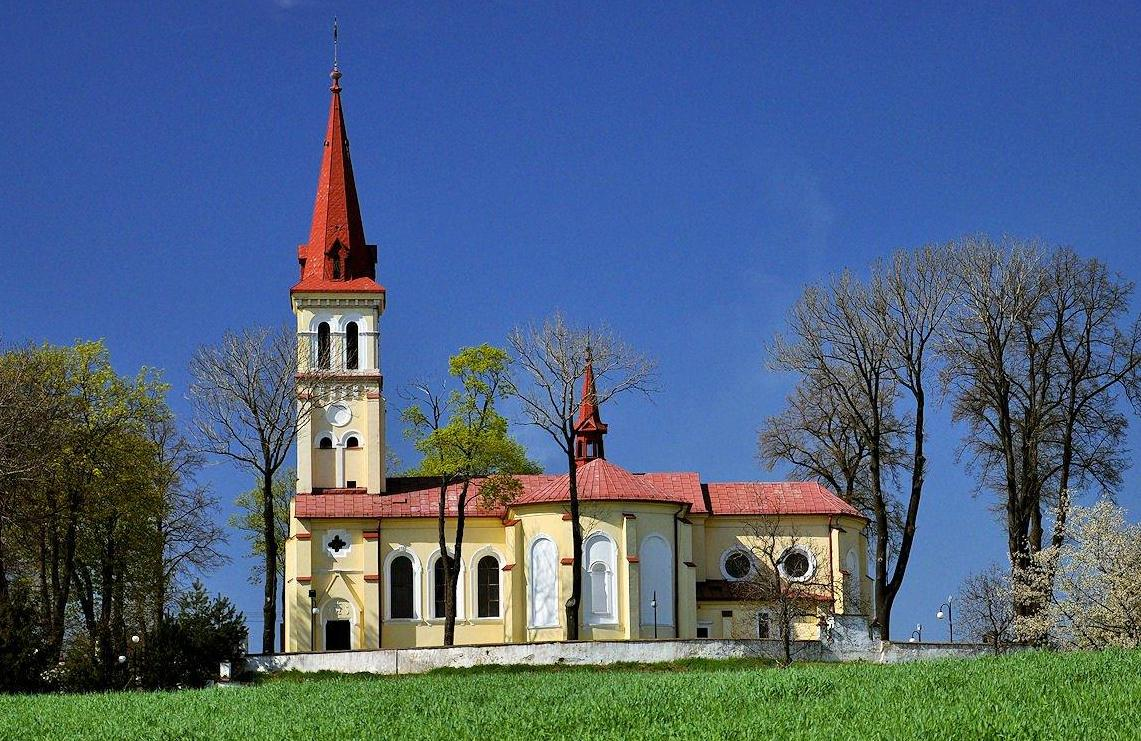
- Catholic church

- Location within Poland
- Coordinates: 50°26′N 19°1′E
- Country: Poland
- Voivodeship: Silesian
- County: Będzin
- Gmina: Bobrowniki
- Population: 1,406
- Website: http://www.saczow.com

Sączów [ˈsɔnt͡ʂuf] is a village in the administrative district of Gmina Bobrowniki, within Będzin, Silesian Voivodeship, in southern Poland.

The village has a population of 1,406.
