= Wąsów =

- Village
- Location within Poland
- Coordinates: 50°08′14″N 20°12′30″E
- Country: Poland
- Voivodeship: Lesser Poland
- County: Proszowice
- Gmina: Koniusza

Wąsów [ˈvɔ̃suf] is a village in the administrative district of Gmina Koniusza, within Proszowice County, Lesser Poland Voivodeship, in southern Poland.
