= Niegardów-Kolonia =

- Village
- Location within Poland
- Coordinates: 50°12′30″N 20°09′48″E
- Country: Poland
- Voivodeship: Lesser Poland
- County: Proszowice
- Gmina: Koniusza

Niegardów-Kolonia [ɲɛˈɡarduf kɔˈlɔɲa] is a village in the administrative district of Gmina Koniusza, within Proszowice County, Lesser Poland Voivodeship, in southern Poland.
