= Obrażejowice =

- Village
- Location within Poland
- Coordinates: 50°16′N 20°10′E
- Country: Poland
- Voivodeship: Lesser Poland
- County: Proszowice
- Gmina: Radziemice

Obrażejowice [ɔbraʐɛjɔˈvit͡sɛ] is a village in the administrative district of Gmina Radziemice, within Proszowice County, Lesser Poland Voivodeship, in southern Poland.

In 1595, the village was called 'Obrazowice' and it was within Cracow Voivodeship, and Proszowice County. It was under control of three owners: Gabriel, Andrzej and Jan Magnus Tęczyński.
