= Łętkowice =

- Village
- Location within Poland
- Coordinates: 50°16′N 20°11′E
- Country: Poland
- Voivodeship: Lesser Poland
- County: Proszowice
- Gmina: Radziemice

Łętkowice [wɛntkɔˈvit͡sɛ] is a village in the administrative district of Gmina Radziemice, within Proszowice County, Lesser Poland Voivodeship, in southern Poland.

The village is on the renewed Lesser Poland Way of St. James from Sandomierz, to Szczyrk, which resembles the middle age route to Santiago de Compostela
