= Wola Gruszowska =

Wola Gruszowska, Poland
- Village
- Location within Poland
- Coordinates: 50°15′39″N 20°15′27″E
- Country: Poland
- Voivodeship: Lesser Poland
- County: Proszowice
- Gmina: Radziemice

Wola Gruszowska [ˈvɔla ɡruˈʂɔfska] is a village in the administrative district of Gmina Radziemice, within Proszowice County, Lesser Poland Voivodeship, in southern Poland.
