= Battle of Igołomia =

The Battle of Igolomia, one of many skirmishes of the January Uprising, took place on 21 March 1863 near the village of Igolomia in southwestern corner of Russian-controlled Congress Poland. Polish forces under Jozef Smiechowski clashed with the troops of the Imperial Russian Army.

After Marian Langiewicz had fled to Austrian Galicia, remnants of his unit were commanded by General Jozef Smiechowski and Jozef Miniewski. To avoid encirclement, Polish insurgents abandoned their camp in Welecz and marched to Opatowiec, via Wislica. The insurgents, who planned to cross the Austrian border, were chased by troops of the Imperial Russian Army, who harassed and attacked them. The Polish rear was protected by two infantry battalions under Captain Stanislaw Wierzbinski. Near Czernichow and Igolomia, around 800 Poles managed to escape to Galicia, while a smaller unit of insurgents was surrounded by the Russians in Igolomia. After a short skirmish, the Russians either killed or wounded 40 men.

== Sources ==
- Stefan Kieniewicz: Powstanie styczniowe. Warszawa: Państwowe Wydawnictwo Naukowe, 1983. ISBN 83-01-03652-4.
