= Przemęczanki =

- Village
- Location within Poland
- Coordinates: 50°17′N 20°14′E
- Country: Poland
- Voivodeship: Lesser Poland
- County: Proszowice
- Gmina: Radziemice
- Elevation: 310 m (1,020 ft)
- Population (approx.): 170

Przemęczanki [pʂɛmɛnˈt͡ʂaŋki] is a village in the administrative district of Gmina Radziemice, within Proszowice County, Lesser Poland Voivodeship, in southern Poland.

The village has an approximate population of 170.
