= Wronin, Lesser Poland Voivodeship =

Wronin
- Village
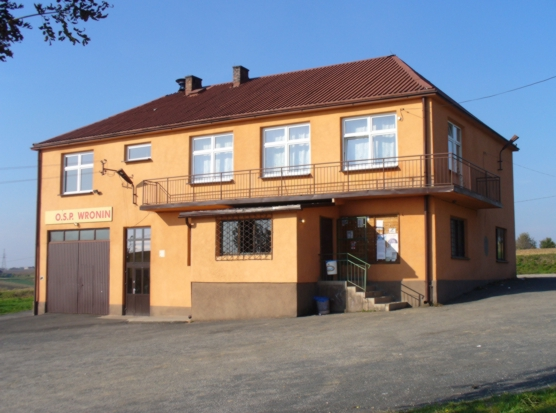
- Fire station

- Location within Poland
- Coordinates: 50°9′N 20°12′E
- Country: Poland
- Voivodeship: Lesser Poland
- County: Proszowice
- Gmina: Koniusza
- Population (approx.): 500

Wronin [ˈvrɔnin] is a village in the administrative district of Gmina Koniusza, within Proszowice County, Lesser Poland Voivodeship, in southern Poland.

The village has an approximate population of 500.
