= Chorążyce, Lesser Poland Voivodeship =

Chorążyce
- Village
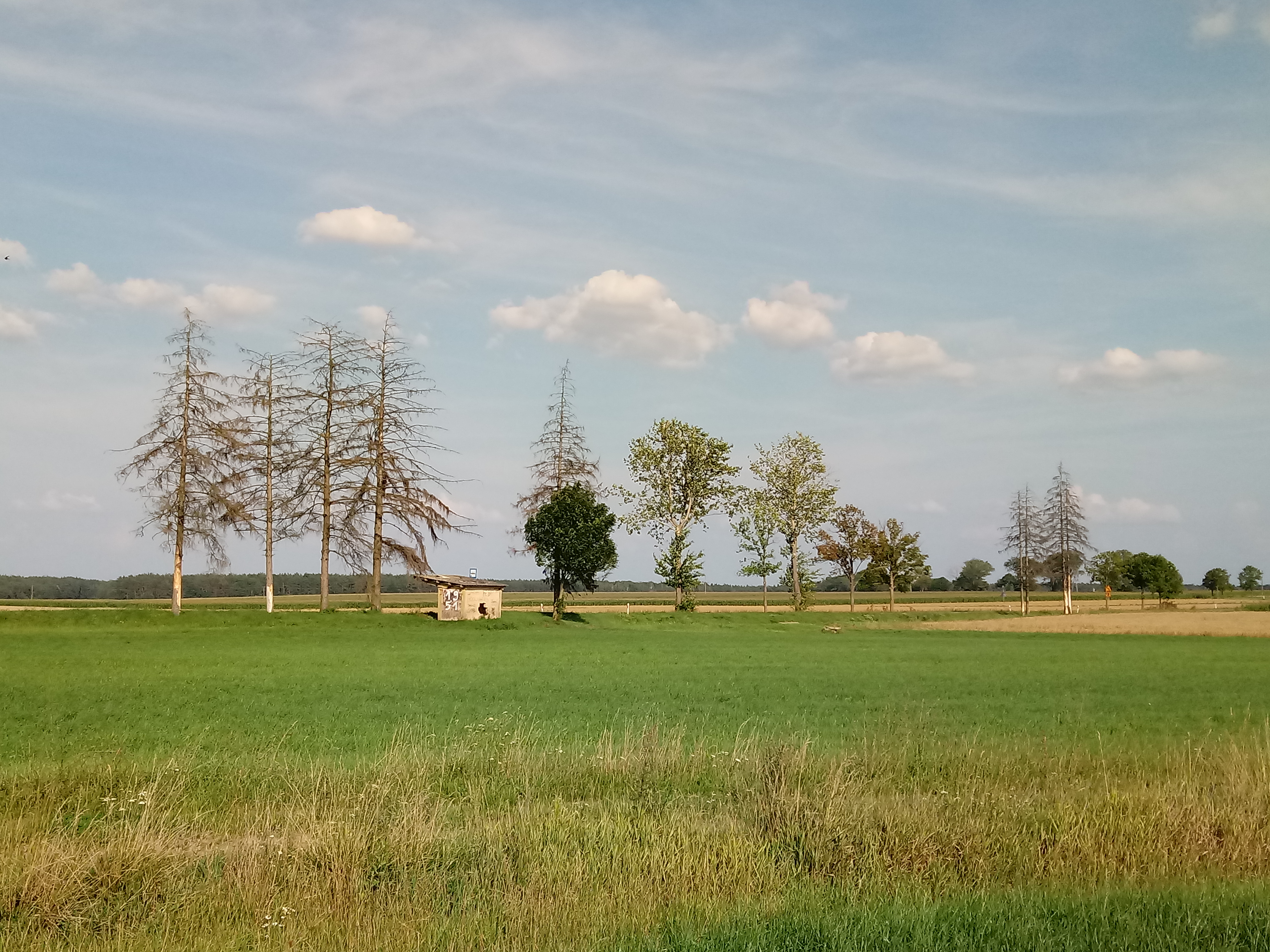

- Location within Poland
- Coordinates: 50°12′N 20°14′E
- Country: Poland
- Voivodeship: Lesser Poland
- County: Proszowice
- Gmina: Koniusza

Chorążyce [xɔrɔ̃ˈʐɨt͡sɛ] is a village in the administrative district of Gmina Koniusza, within Proszowice County, Lesser Poland Voivodeship, in southern Poland.
