= Posądza =

- Village
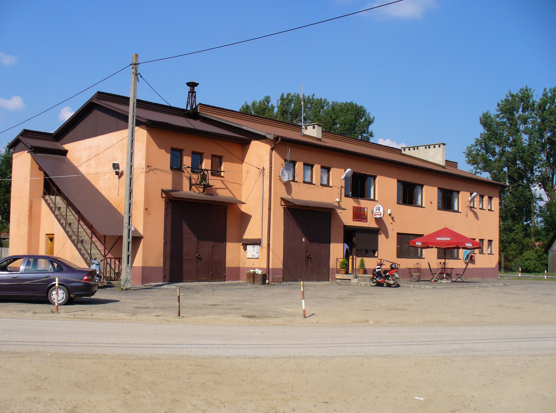

- Location within Poland
- Coordinates: 50°11′N 20°15′E
- Country: Poland
- Voivodeship: Lesser Poland
- County: Proszowice
- Gmina: Koniusza
- Time zone: UTC+1 (CET)
  - Summer (DST): UTC+2 (CEST)
- Vehicle registration: KPR

Posądza [pɔˈsɔnd͡za] is a village in the administrative district of Gmina Koniusza, within Proszowice County, Lesser Poland Voivodeship, in southern Poland.

== History ==
In 1827, Posądza had a population of 159.

Following the joint German-Soviet invasion of Poland, which started World War II in September 1939, the village was occupied by Germany until 1945. On June 22, 1943, the Germans carried out a massacre of seven local Poles, including a ten-year-old child and two two-year-old children, as punishment for rescuing Jews from the Holocaust.
