= Kowary, Lesser Poland Voivodeship =

Kowary
- Village
- Location within Poland
- Coordinates: 50°14′N 20°16′E
- Country: Poland
- Voivodeship: Lesser Poland
- County: Proszowice
- Gmina: Radziemice

Kowary [kɔˈvarɨ] is a village in the administrative district of Gmina Radziemice, within Proszowice County, Lesser Poland Voivodeship, in southern Poland.
