= Oskar Karliner =

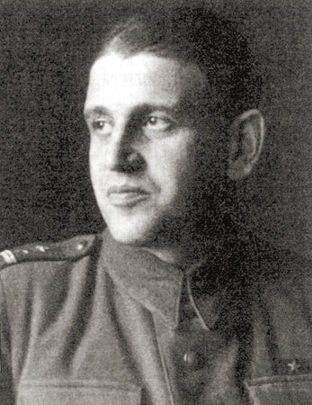
- Born: 10 May 1907; Lviv, Poland (today Ukraine)
- Died: 8 December 1988 (aged 81); Tel Aviv, Israel
- Alma mater: University of Warsaw
- Military career
- Allegiance: Soviet Union; Polish People's Republic
- Branch: Polish People's Army
- Service years: 1941, 1944–1956
- Rank: Pułkownik
- Unit: Supreme Military Court
- Conflicts: World War II
- Awards: Order of Polonia Restituta, Cross of Valour

Oskar Karliner, originally Szyja Karliner, pseudonym 'Stefan' (born May 10, 1907, in Drohobych - December 8, 1988 in Tel Aviv) was a Polish-Jewish communist activist, military prosecutor, deputy president of the Supreme Military Court in 1949–1953, responsible for judicial murders.

== Biography ==
He was born in Drohobych to a Jewish family, the son of Chaim Karliner. In 1926, he began studying law at the Jagiellonian University in Kraków, from where he was expelled in 1932 for communist activities. He did not receive his master's degree until 1952 at the University of Warsaw.

In 1924, he joined the Communist Youth Union of Western Ukraine (KZMZU). In 1928–1929, he was active in the PPS-Left, within which he held the position of secretary of the Drohobych City Committee. At the end of 1930, he began working in the Military Department of the Central Committee of the Polish Communist Party in Kraków. He edited and distributed communist leaflets and proclamations. On June 8, 1932, he was arrested and, alongside Roman Śliwa, was one of the main defendants in the trial of activists of the Military Department of the Central Committee of the Polish Communist Party. On February 13, 1934, he was sentenced to 6 years in prison. He was released on September 1, 1936, under an amnesty, after which he was under police supervision. He took up work as a clerk in the "Fortuna" Furniture House in Sosnowiec. After the Soviet invasion of Poland, he moved to the Soviet occupation zone. He worked as a clerk in the Municipal Heating Office, then in the District Planning Commission in Drohobych. After the German attack on the USSR, he was mobilized to the Red Army. In July, he was wounded near Uman, was hospitalized, and in November 1941, he was conscripted into a labor battalion. In 1943–1944 he was a convoy and then a clerk at a forest transport company in the Mari ASSR.

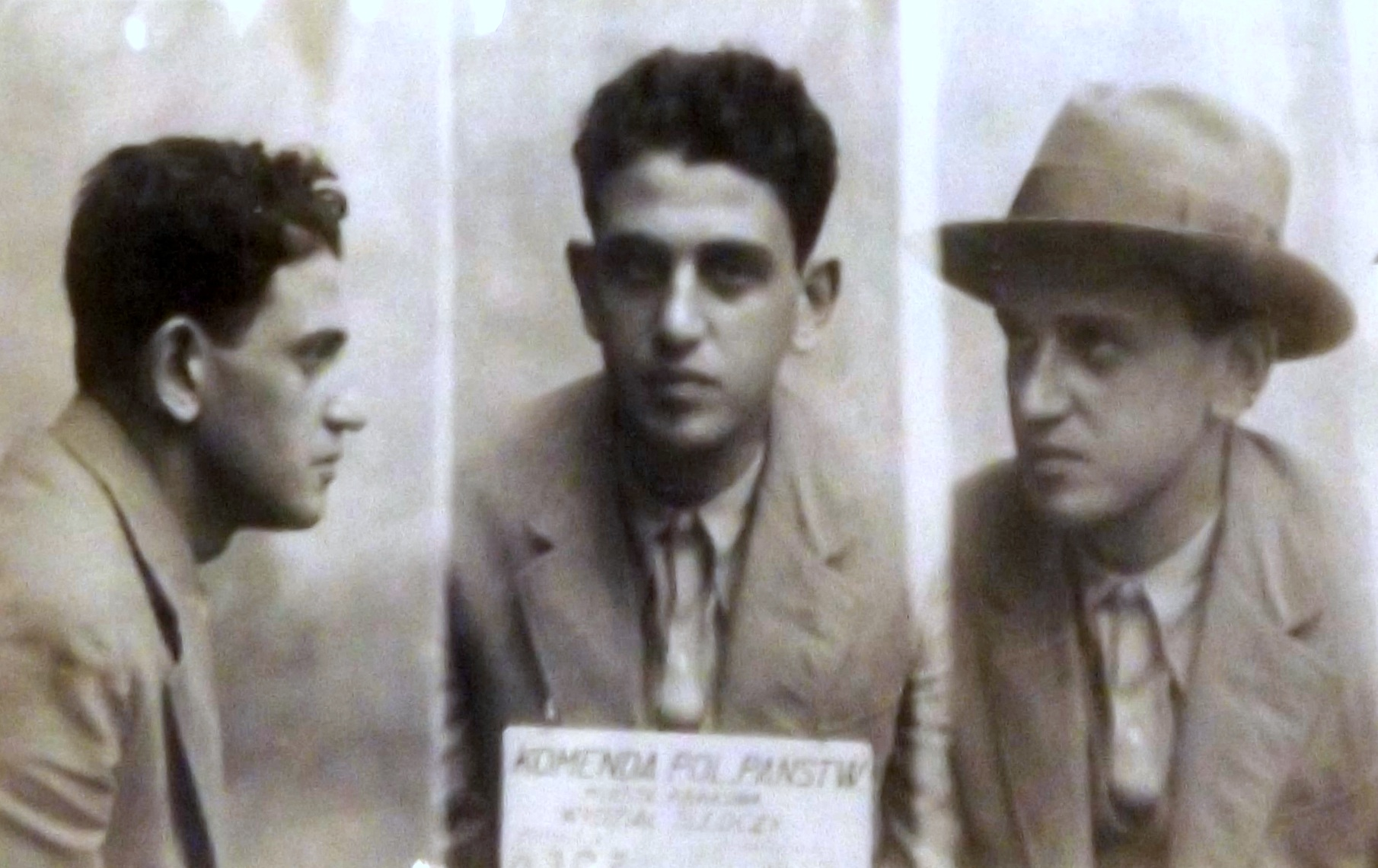
Mugshot of Karliner following his arrest by the State Police in 1932

After establishing contact with the Union of Polish Patriots, in July 1944 he joined the Polish People's Army. Initially, he was an investigating officer in the prosecutor's office of the 2nd Army, then the 1st Military District. From 1946 a member of the Polish Workers' Party and following its union with the Socialist Party in December 1948 he became a member of the ruling Polish United Workers' Party. On December 31, 1945, by order of the Supreme Command, he was promoted to major. From March 1946, he was the head of the District Military Prosecutor's Office in Poznań, then in Kraków. He prosecuted in the trial of the PPS-WRN leadership in November 1948 in Warsaw. In November 1949, he was appointed First Deputy President of the Supreme Military Court (NSW). From 1953, he worked at the General Military Prosecutor's Office. From March 1954, he was the head of the Military Court Board. He was the author of the justification of the verdict in the trial of General Stanisław Tatar.

The commission to investigate the responsibility of former employees of the Main Information Directorate, the Chief Military Prosecutor's Office and the Supreme Military Police (established in 1956) established that Karliner was responsible, among other things, for introducing the practice of extending detention, initiating an unjustified tightening of criminal repression in the Supreme Military Police and sentencing based on uncertain evidence, exerting pressure on the court to sentence to certain high penalties (according to the suggestions of the security organs, as well as on his own initiative) and for setting court verdicts to the greatest possible submissiveness to the demands of the investigative bodies and the prosecutor's office, violating the defendants' right to defense. Although the commission requested, among other things, Karliner's demotion to the rank of reserve major and a ban on working in the justice system for 5 years, on December 13, 1956, he was demobilized at the rank of colonel. In 1957 he became director of the International Cooperation Team in the Office of the Government Plenipotentiary for the Use of Nuclear Energy.

In March 1968, in the wave of anti-Semitic campaigns that resulted from the March Events, he was expelled from the Polish United Workers' Party. After being dismissed from work and receiving a military pension in 1969, he made Aliyah to Israel, where he died. His son Mark is a physician in University of Tel Aviv.
