= Przesławice, Proszowice County =

Przesławice
- Village
- Location within Poland
- Coordinates: 50°12′08″N 20°12′47″E
- Country: Poland
- Voivodeship: Lesser Poland
- County: Proszowice
- Gmina: Koniusza

Przesławice [pʂɛswaˈvit͡sɛ] is a village in the administrative district of Gmina Koniusza, within Proszowice County, Lesser Poland Voivodeship, in southern Poland.
