= Błogocice =

- Village
- Location within Poland
- Coordinates: 50°15′N 20°14′E
- Country: Poland
- Voivodeship: Lesser Poland
- County: Proszowice
- Gmina: Radziemice

Błogocice [bwɔɡɔˈt͡ɕit͡sɛ] is a village in the administrative district of Gmina Radziemice, within Proszowice County, Lesser Poland Voivodeship, in southern Poland.
