= Czernichów =

Czernichów may refer to:

- Czernichów, Kraków County in Lesser Poland Voivodeship (south Poland)
- Czernichów, Proszowice County in Lesser Poland Voivodeship (south Poland)
- Czernichów, Silesian Voivodeship (south Poland)
- Polish name for Chernihiv, a town in Ukraine
