= Kaczowice =

- Village
- Location within Poland
- Coordinates: 50°17′12″N 20°14′10″E
- Country: Poland
- Voivodeship: Lesser Poland
- County: Proszowice
- Gmina: Radziemice

Kaczowice [kat͡ʂɔˈvit͡sɛ] is a village in the administrative district of Gmina Radziemice, within Proszowice County, Lesser Poland Voivodeship, in southern Poland.
