= Gmina Koniusza =

Gmina Koniusza Koniusza Commune
- Gmina
- Flag Coat of arms
- Interactive map of Gmina Koniusza
- Coordinates (Koniusza): 50°12′N 20°14′E
- Country: Poland
- Voivodeship: Lesser Poland
- County: Proszowice
- Seat: Koniusza

Area
  - Total: 88.5 km^{2} (34.2 sq mi)

Population (2006)
  - Total: 8,663
  - Density: 97.9/km^{2} (254/sq mi)
- Website: https://koniusza.pl/

Gmina Koniusza is a rural gmina (administrative district) in Proszowice County, Lesser Poland Voivodeship, in southern Poland. Its seat is the village of Koniusza, which lies approximately 5 kilometres (3 mi) west of Proszowice and 27 km (17 mi) north-east of the regional capital Kraków.

The gmina covers an area of 88.5 square kilometres (34.2 sq mi), and as of 2006 its total population is 8,663.

== Villages ==
Gmina Koniusza contains the villages and settlements of Biórków Mały, Biórków Wielki, Chorążyce, Czernichów, Dalewice, Glew, Glewiec, Gnatowice, Górka Jaklińska, Karwin, Koniusza, Łyszkowice, Muniaczkowice, Niegardów, Niegardów-Kolonia, Piotrkowice Małe, Piotrkowice Wielkie, Polekarcice, Posądza, Przesławice, Rzędowice, Siedliska, Szarbia, Wąsów, Wierzbno, Wroniec, Wronin and Zielona.

== Neighbouring gminas ==
Gmina Koniusza is bordered by the gminas of Igołomia-Wawrzeńczyce, Kocmyrzów-Luborzyca, Proszowice, Radziemice and Słomniki.
