= Kąty, Proszowice County =

Kąty
- Village
- Location within Poland
- Coordinates: 50°14′35″N 20°12′38″E
- Country: Poland
- Voivodeship: Lesser Poland
- County: Proszowice
- Gmina: Radziemice

Kąty [ˈkɔntɨ] is a village in the administrative district of Gmina Radziemice, within Proszowice County, Lesser Poland Voivodeship, in southern Poland.
