= Siedliska, Gmina Koniusza =

Siedliska
- Village
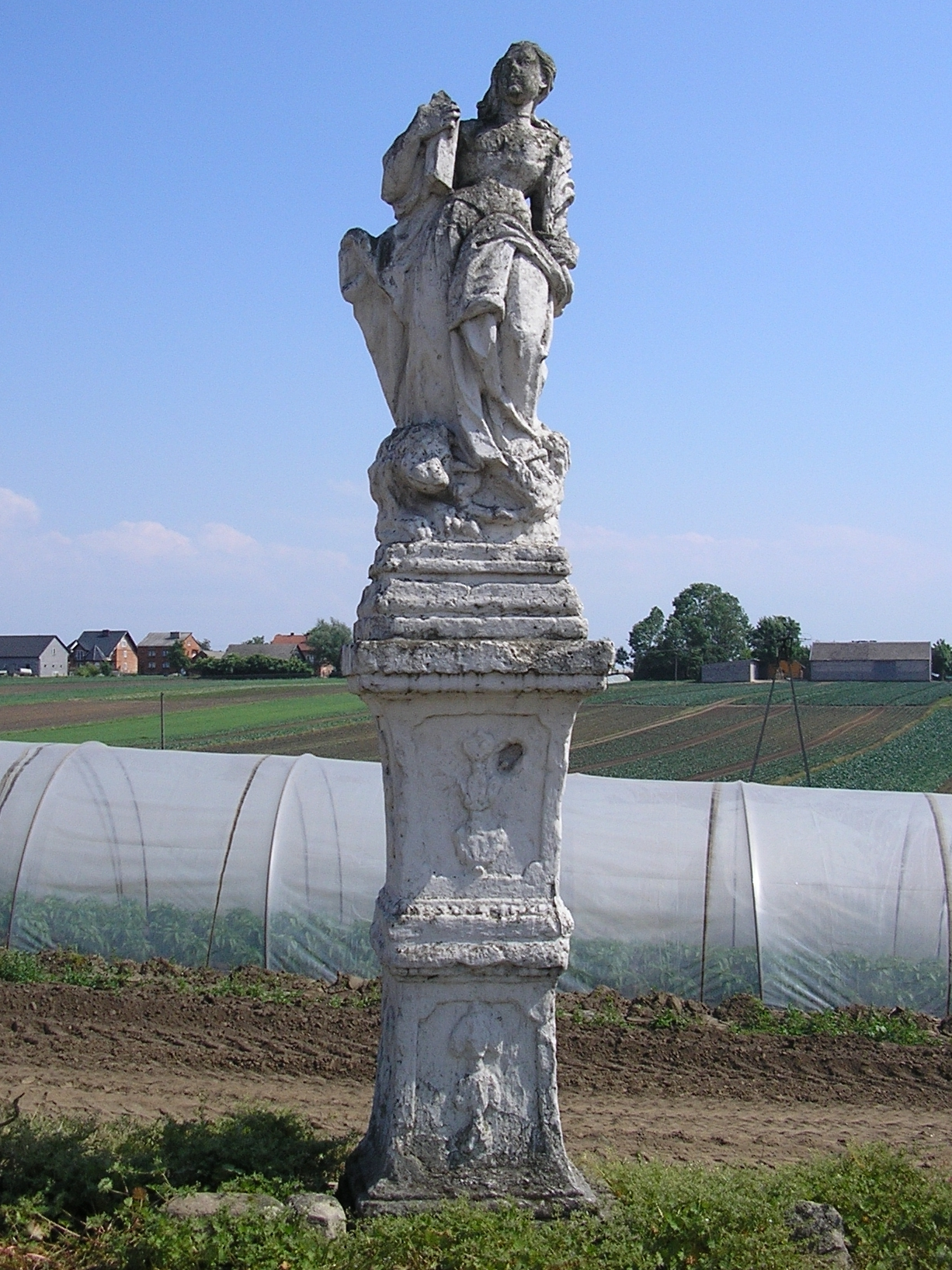
- Saint Thecla Monument in Siedliska.

- Location within Poland
- Coordinates: 50°09′47″N 20°13′17″E
- Country: Poland
- Voivodeship: Lesser Poland
- County: Proszowice
- Gmina: Koniusza

Siedliska [ɕɛdˈlʲiska] is a village in the administrative district of Gmina Koniusza, within Proszowice County, Lesser Poland Voivodeship, in southern Poland.

It is located on route 776. Its name means 'habitat'.
