= Wrocimowice =

- Village
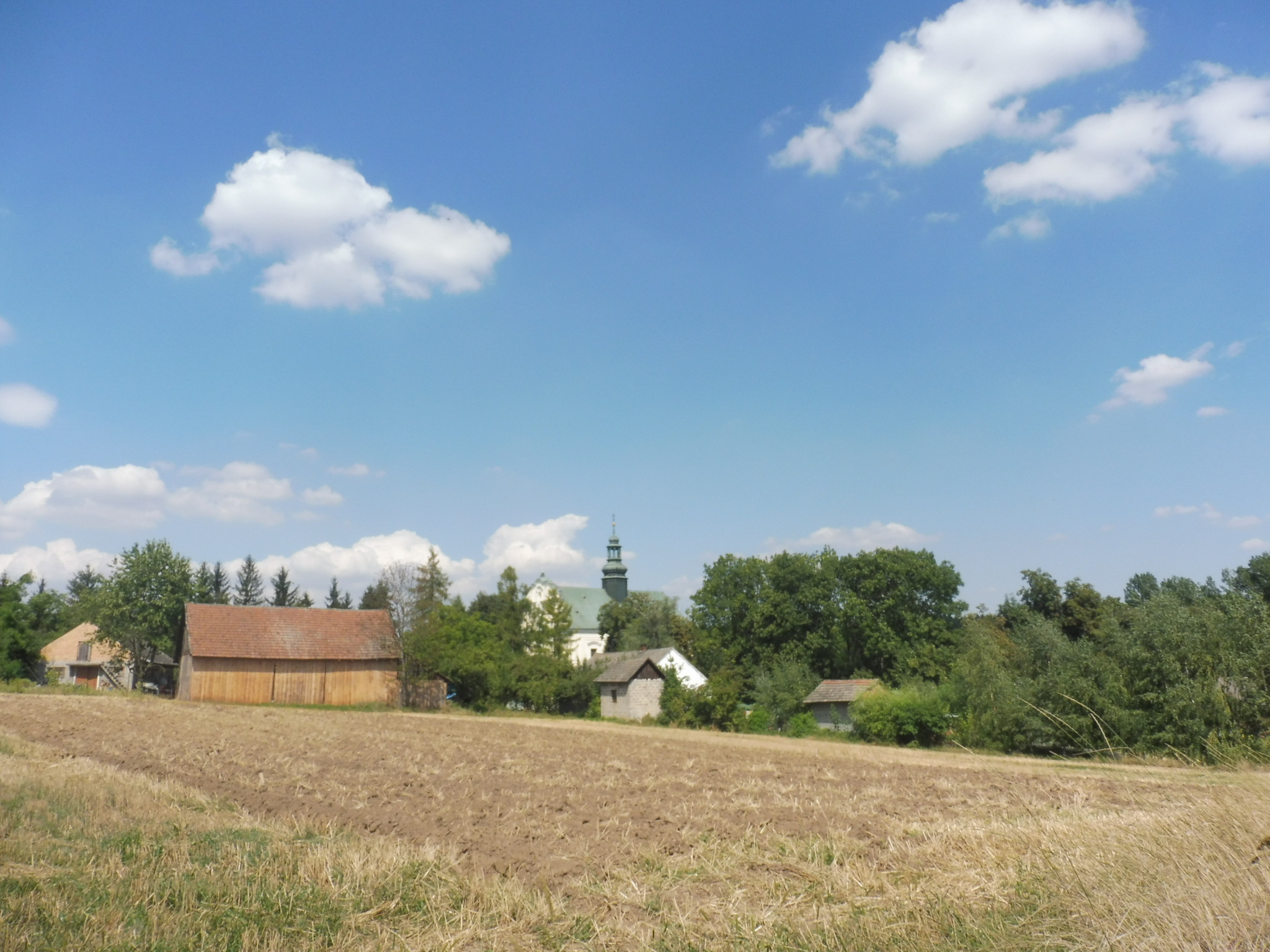

- Location within Poland
- Coordinates: 50°18′N 20°15′E
- Country: Poland
- Voivodeship: Lesser Poland
- County: Proszowice
- Gmina: Radziemice

Wrocimowice [vrɔt͡ɕimɔˈvit͡sɛ] is a village in the administrative district of Gmina Radziemice, within Proszowice County, Lesser Poland Voivodeship, in southern Poland.
