= Niegardów =

- Village
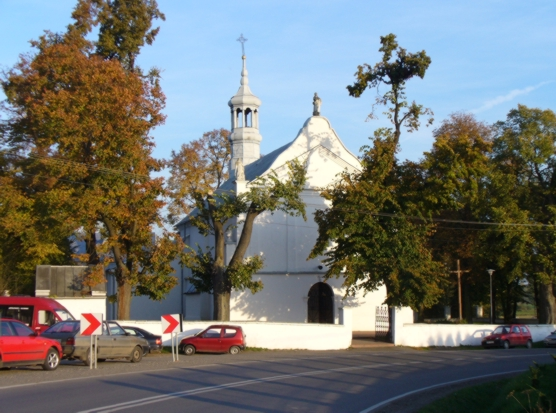
- Church of Saint James the Elder

- Location within Poland
- Coordinates: 50°13′N 20°11′E
- Country: Poland
- Voivodeship: Lesser Poland
- County: Proszowice
- Gmina: Koniusza

Niegardów [ɲɛˈɡarduf] is a village in the administrative district of Gmina Koniusza, within Proszowice County, Lesser Poland Voivodeship, in southern Poland.

== See also ==
- Lesser Polish Way
