= Zielenice =

Zielenice may refer to the following places in Poland:

- Zielenice, Lower Silesian Voivodeship (south-west Poland)
- Zielenice, Lesser Poland Voivodeship (south Poland)
