= Dalewice =

- Village
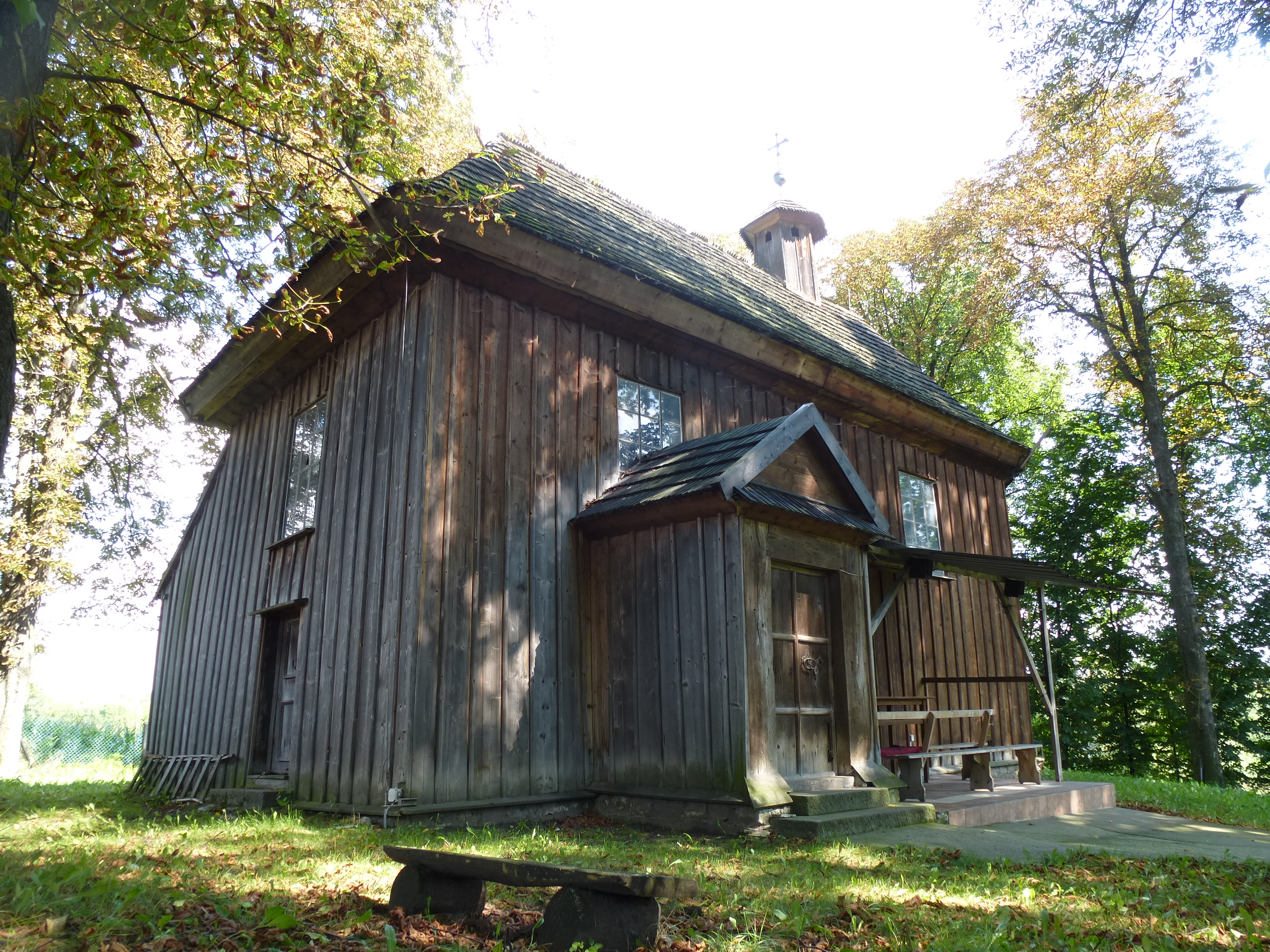
- Catholic chapel

- Location within Poland
- Coordinates: 50°14′N 20°14′E
- Country: Poland
- Voivodeship: Lesser Poland
- County: Proszowice
- Gmina: Koniusza

Dalewice [dalɛˈvit͡sɛ] is a village in the administrative district of Gmina Koniusza, within Proszowice County, Lesser Poland Voivodeship, in southern Poland.
