= Zielona, Proszowice County =

Zielona
- Village
- Location within Poland
- Coordinates: 50°09′22″N 20°08′45″E
- Country: Poland
- Voivodeship: Lesser Poland
- County: Proszowice
- Gmina: Koniusza

Zielona [ʑɛˈlɔna] is a village in the administrative district of Gmina Koniusza, within Proszowice County, Lesser Poland Voivodeship, in southern Poland.
