= Glew =

Glew may refer to:

- Glew, Argentina, a city in Buenos Aires Province
- Glew, Lesser Poland Voivodeship, a village in Southern Poland
- Great Lakes Engineering Works, a shipbuilding company with a shipyard in River Rouge, Michigan that operated between 1902 and 1960
- Glew (character), a fictional character in Lloyd Alexander's children's series The Chronicles of Prydain
- OpenGL Extension Wrangler Library (GLEW), a cross-platform C/C++ library that helps in querying and loading OpenGL extensions
