= Karwin =

Karwin may refer to:

- Karwin, Lesser Poland Voivodeship, a village in south Poland
- Karwin, Lubusz Voivodeship, a village in west Poland
- Karwin, West Pomeranian Voivodeship, a village in northwest Poland
- Karviná (German: Karwin), a city in the Moravian-Silesian Region of the Czech Republic
