= Adam Grzymała-Siedlecki =

Polish literary and theater critic, playwright, translator, prose writer and director

Adam Franciszek Józef Grzymała-Siedlecki
- Adam Franciszek Józef Siedlecki
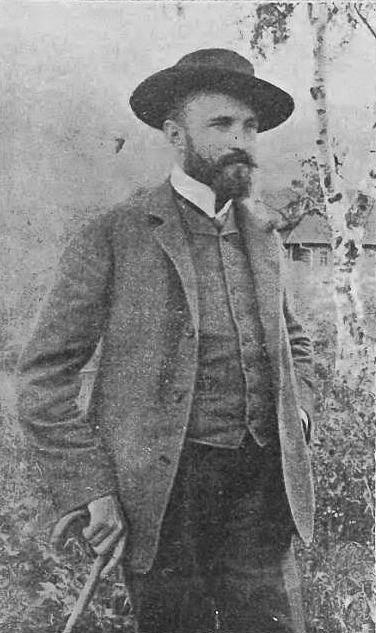
- Adam Grzymała-Siedlecki ca 1906
- Born: 29 January 1876; Wierzbno Russian Empire
- Died: 29 January 1967 (aged 91); Bydgoszcz, Poland
- Resting place: Nowofarny cemetery, Bydgoszcz
- Occupations: Writer, critic
- Spouse: Maria Szumowska
- Children: Jacek
- Awards

Adam Franciszek Józef Siedlecki or Adam Grzymała-Siedlecki (AGS) (1876–1967) was a Polish literary and theater critic, playwright, translator, prose writer and director.

== Biography ==
=== Congress Poland period ===
Adam Grzymała-Siedlecki was born into an impoverished noble family on 29 January 1876 in Wierzbno, near Kraków, then part of the Russian Empire. His mother was named Julia, née Pieprzak-Czaykowski. His father, Leon, a commune writer, took part to the 1863 January uprising.

Adam graduated from secondary school in Warsaw. He then started to study at the Wawelberg and Rotwand's School of Engineering in 1894, but had to drop off in 1896, after being jailed at the dreaded Tenth Pavilion of the Warsaw Citadel for participating in illegal Polish self-education clubs. After his release, he moved to Kraków to follow mathematics and Polish at the Jagiellonian University.

His first articles date back to 1896, with a review in the Warsaw paper Dziennik dla szystkich. From 1897 onwards, he collaborated with numerous newsletter magazines (from Warsaw, Krakow, Lviv), publishing over 1,500 articles and reviews. It is around that time that Adam began to add the Grzymała coat of arms and calling to his name, becoming Adam Grzymała-Siedlecki.

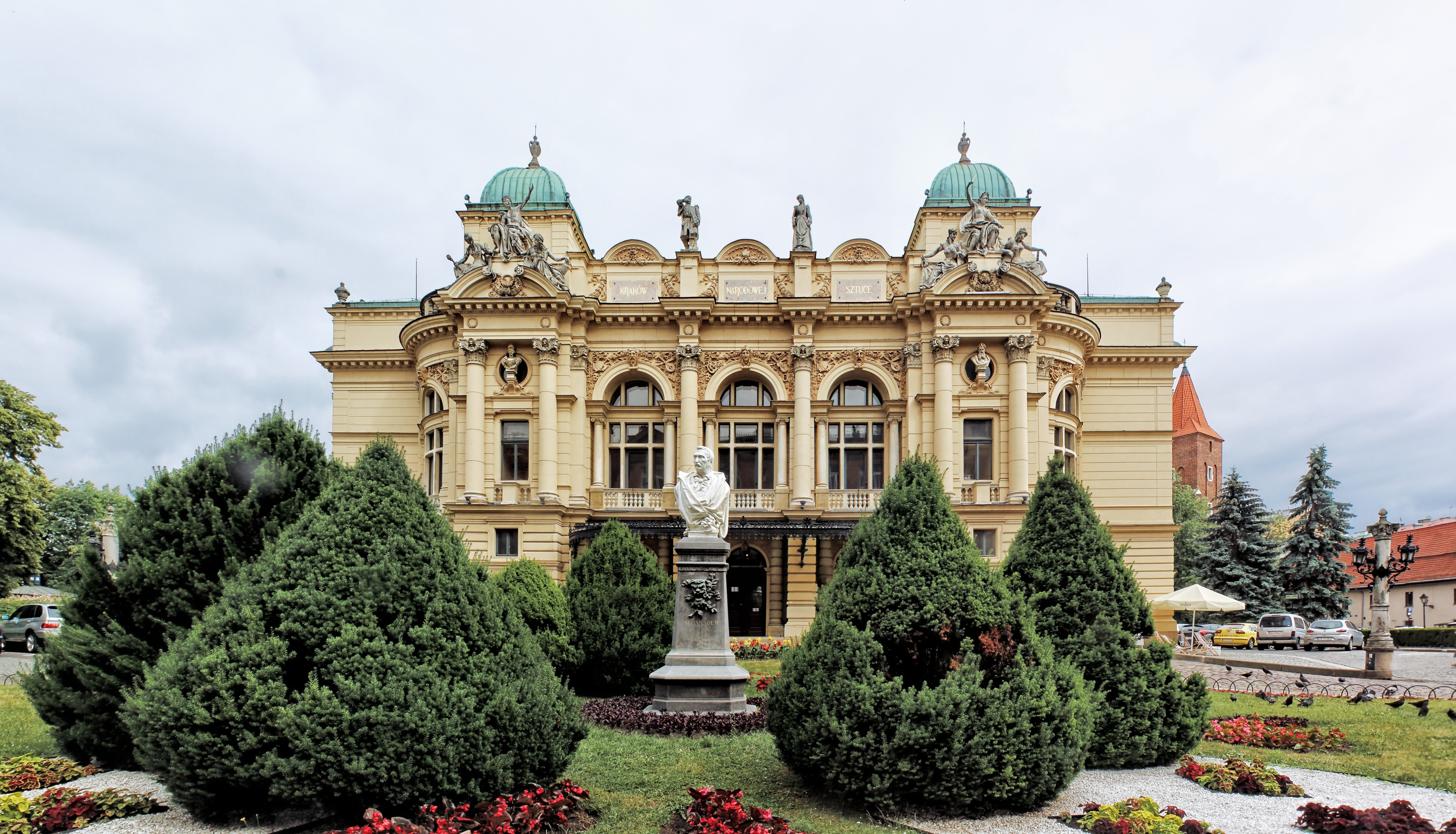
Słowacki theatre in Kraków

At the turn of the 20th century, he made a 6-month journey to Italy as a correspondent for Kraków paper Głosu Narodu. In Kraków, he had a frenzy activity:

- literature teacher at M. Przybyłowicz's drama school (1905);
- founder and director of the Old Ludowy theatre (1905–1906 and 1916–1918);
- literary manager at the Juliusz Słowacki Theatre under the lead of Ludwik Solski (1906–1911) and Tadeusz Pawlikowski (1916–1918);
- organizer -among others- of the Union of Artists of Polish Theaters in Galicia (1910).

In 1909, Grzymała-Siedlecki wrote his first book, "Wyspiański. Features and elements of his work" (Polish: Wyspiański. Cechy i elementy jego twórczości). He was a regular animator of Zielony Balonik, a popular cabaret of Kraków. He occasionally performed on the stage (e.g. a parody of Stanisław Tarnowski) and even wrote memoirs about the beginnings of this institution, "Ludzie Zielonego Balonika", (People of the Zielony Balonik) in the magazin Teatr (issue N. 9, 1951).

He traveled in Europe between 1911 and 1912, in particular to Switzerland, France and England.

From 1913 to 1915, Adam moved to Warsaw as literary manager of the Teatr Rozmaitości w Warszawie, before returning to Kraków.

=== Interwar period ===
After the end of WWI and following a disagreement Kraków City Council, he resigned as Director of the theatre and moved to Warsaw. With the re-creation of the Polish state, AGS joined the political life as a supporter of National Democracy party. Furthermore, he became from 1918 to 1921 the co-editor of the Tygodnik Illustrowany: as such, he made a trip in June 1919, to Paris to report about the negotiations around the elaboration of the future Treaty of Versailles. Thanks to Ignacy Jan Paderewski, then Prime minister and Minister of Foreign Affairs, who was leading the Polish party, Grzymała-Siedlecki was entrusted as liaison element between the Polish delegation and the national press. On 28 June 1919 he was one of the representatives of the Polish press at the official signing ceremony of the Peace Treaty at Versailles.

During Polish–Soviet War, Adam was a war correspondent. He later compiled his frontline articles in a book, "The Miracle on the Vistula" (Polish: Cud Wisły). Afterwards, he kept his post at the Tygodnik Illustrowany and in addition cooperated with other newspapers (Kurier Warszawski and Rzeczpospolita).

In October 1923, he moved to Bydgoszcz, and lived there until July 1934. When asked about the rationale for choosing this city, Adam Grzymała-Siedlecki used to claim that he was

attracted to the land where his ancestors originated from, (that he) [...] recognized the political and strategic importance of the region [...], and finally that (he) saw there favorable conditions for quietness, necessary for literary works.

In Bydgoszcz, he devoted his time to writing. He mainly created comedies and farces played in theaters. His most popular pieces from this period are:

- "Sublokatorka" (1922);
- "Popas Króla Jegomości" (Popas the King of Goodness) (1922);

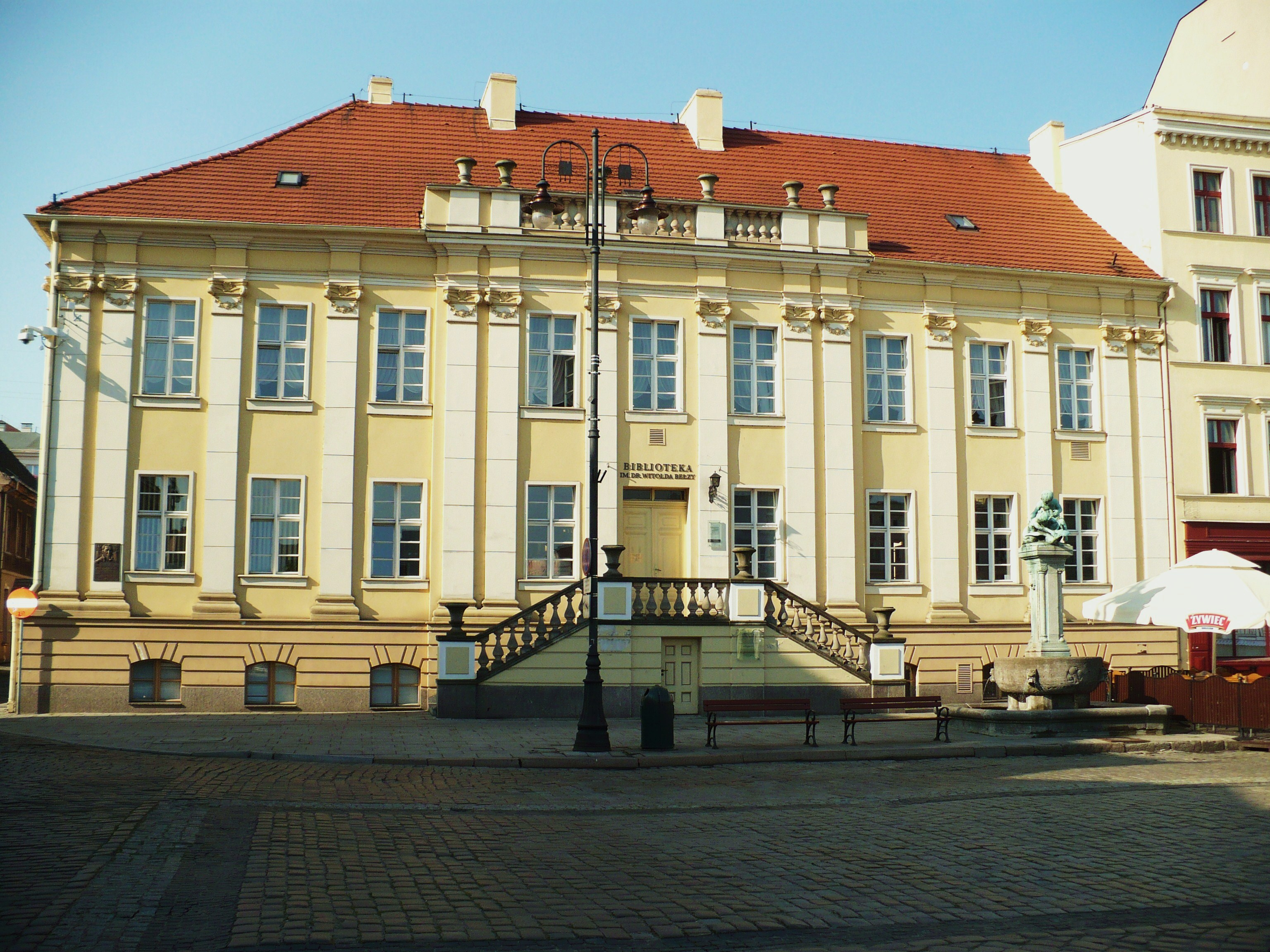
Provincial and Municipal Public Library in Bydgoszcz

- "Spadkobierca" (The heir) (1924);
- "Samosęki" (1924);
- "Mamon do wzięcia" (Mamon for the taking) (1929);
- "Miechowiec & syn" (Miechowiec & son) and "Czwarty do brydża" (Four to the bridge) (1934).

He also wrote articles and columns for newspapers in Warsaw, Poznań (Kurier Poznański) and Bydgoszcz (Dziennik Bydgoski, Hallerczyk, Gazeta Bydgoska). His topics covered not only artistic and literary matters, but also highlighted the importance of Greater Poland and Pomerania regions for the Second Republic of Poland and warned of the dangers of the nascent Nazi Germany.

Grzymała-Siedlecki actively participated in the intellectual and cultural life of Bydgoszcz, giving lectures, readings and organizing artistic events. From 1925 to 1927, he took part in the committee for the construction of the Henryk Sienkiewicz Monument in Bydgoszcz, the first to be erected in Poland. After 1926, he acted against the Sanacja political regime. In May 1923, AGS contributed with 50,000 marks for the garrison church. The entrepreneur Antoni Weynerowski and his wife Leokadia donated 500,000 marks.

He worked on a sketch encompassing the History of Bydgoszcz from the earliest times. Underlining the underrated significance of the city, he championed on the one hand its incorporation into the Pomeranian Voivodeship and on the other hand the transfer of provincial authorities from Toruń to Bydgoszcz. In particular, he conveyed these messages, in response to a Toruń publication, in the polemical brochure "Pomorze czy Toruń?" (Pomerania or Toruń?) published in 1937.

He closely cooperated with the Provincial and Municipal Public Library in Bydgoszcz, to which he eventually bequeathed approx. 5 000 literary objects. At the beginning of the 1930s, Adam surprised the intellectual community by giving to the library a dozen of books from Vladimir Lenin's Poronin collection, from the period when the soviet leader-to-be used to stay in the Polish Tatra (1913–1914). However, in 1945, the City Council handed it over back to the Soviet Union as a gift from the Polish People's Republic.

In 1934, he left Bydgoszcz to Warsaw. A year later, he published a book about Ludwik Solski for his jubilee and in 1938, he prepared a biographic film script about Solski, "Geniusz sceny" (Genius of the scene).

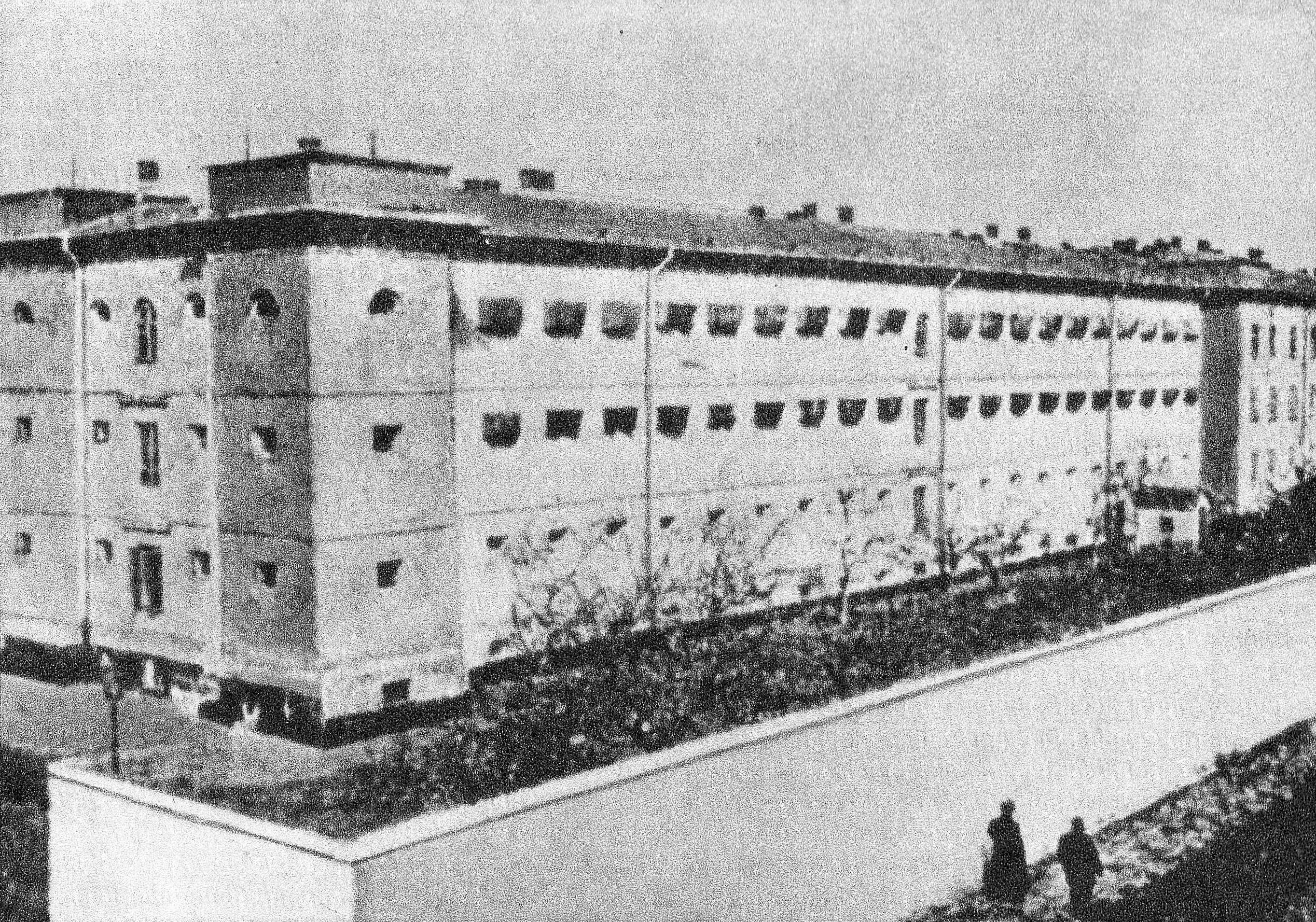
Pawiak Prison ca 1939

=== German occupation ===
During the 1939 invasion of Poland, Grzymała-Siedlecki was in Warsaw: from the beginning of the occupation, he was watched and followed by the Gestapo. In 1940–1941, he worked as a clerk in the Council of the Central Welfare (Polish: Rada Główna Opiekuńcza). In February 1940, he was interrogated in connection with anti-German articles published before the war in the polish press (Kurier Warszawski and Kurier Poznański). He was even arrested on the night of 10 November 1942 and jailed in Warsaw Pawiak prison. Released in February 1943, he moved to hiding in Bielany, near Grójec, where the conditions of his imprisonment weakened him for a long time.

As an account of his experiences and observations from his stay in Pawiak prison, Adam wrote in 1944, "111 dni letargu. Wspomnienia z Pawiaka z lat 1942–1943" (111 days of lethargy. Memories from Pawiak prison in 1942–1943). The poet Ludwik Hieronim Morstin praised this book as "A shocking book, which, thanks to its humanism and proximity to a suffering man, is especially valuable to anyone who pursues some purpose in life." (correspondence with the author, 18 October 1965).

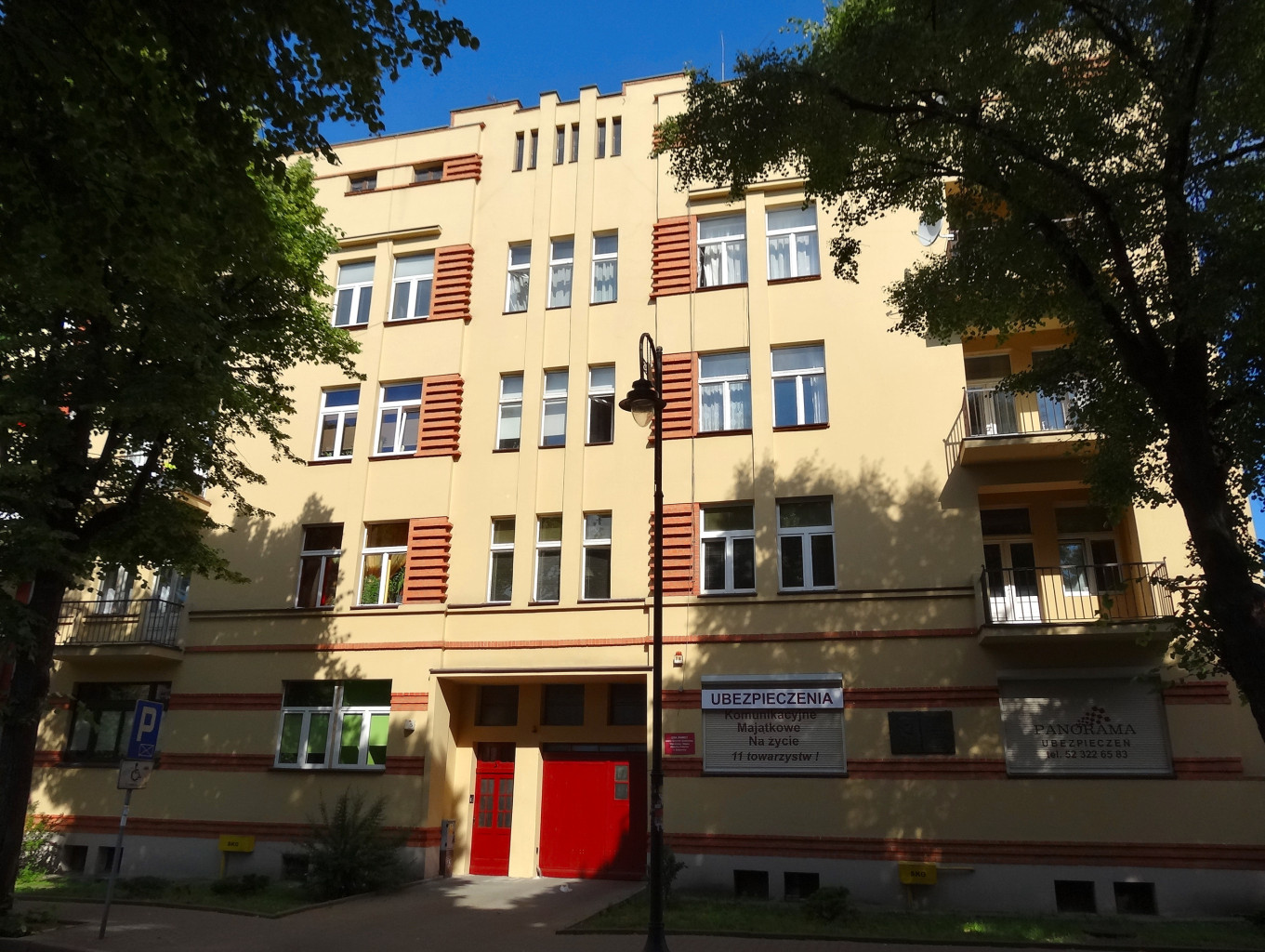
Bydgoszcz tenement where the writer lived at N.5 until his demise

=== Post-war period ===
In April 1945, he settled back to Bydgoszcz. He got a position at the Department of Culture and Art of the Pomeranian Voivodeship Office, as a voivodship counselor, head of the Literature and Theater Department, until 1949.

Meanwhile, he contributed to diverse institutions in Bydgoszcz:

- lecturer at the Bydgoszcz Dramatic School established at 4 Cieszkowskiego Street (1945–1947);
- theater history lecturer in the Theatre instructors and directors school for Volunteers (Polish: Szkoła Instruktorów i Reżyserów Teatrów Ochotniczych w Bydgoszczy) (1949–1952);
- literary director at the Polski Teatr in Bydgoszcz (1946–1960).

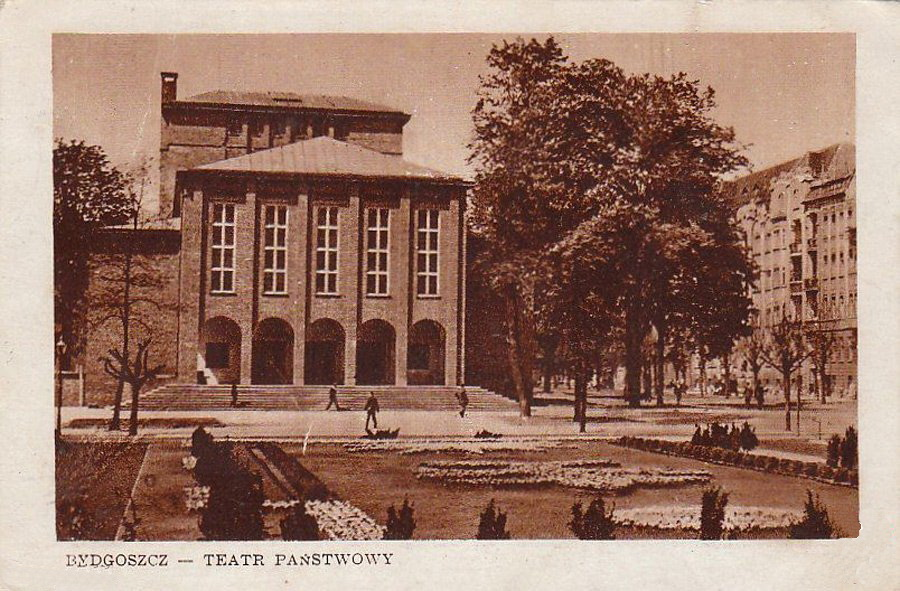
Teatr Polski in the 1950s

Between 1948 and 1958, Grzymała-Siedlecki directed many plays in the city:

- "Przyjaciele" (Friends);
- "Powrót posła" (Return of the envoy);
- "Magazyn mód";
- "Intryga i miłość" (Intrigue and love);
- "Wesele" (Wedding).

In 1961, he received the title of Honorary director of the Polski Teatr in Bydgoszcz, commemorating the 65th anniversary of his first writing and the 50th anniversary of his theatrical career.

Similarly to his previous stay, he initiated many cultural activities in Bydgoszcz. He was still working as a columnist and literary critic with journals Ilustrowany Kurier Polski and Tygodnik Warszawski(1945–1946) initially. Later on, he cooperated with a multitude of others: Arkona, Łodz Teatralna, Odnowy, Ziemia Pomorska, Żołnierz Polski, Życie Literackie, Twórczość, Tygodnik Powszechny, Teatr, Pamiętnik Teatralny or Pomerania.

He devoted enthusiastically his time to literary work. While in Bydgoszcz, Grzymała-Siedlecki wrote various works:

- books: "Wesele pani du Barry" (Madame du Barry's Wedding), "Matka i kurtyzana" (Mother and Courtesan), "Rekin i syrena" (The Shark and the Mermaid);
- memoirs focusing on history of theater and literature: "Świat aktorski moich czasów" (The world of acting in my time) (1957),
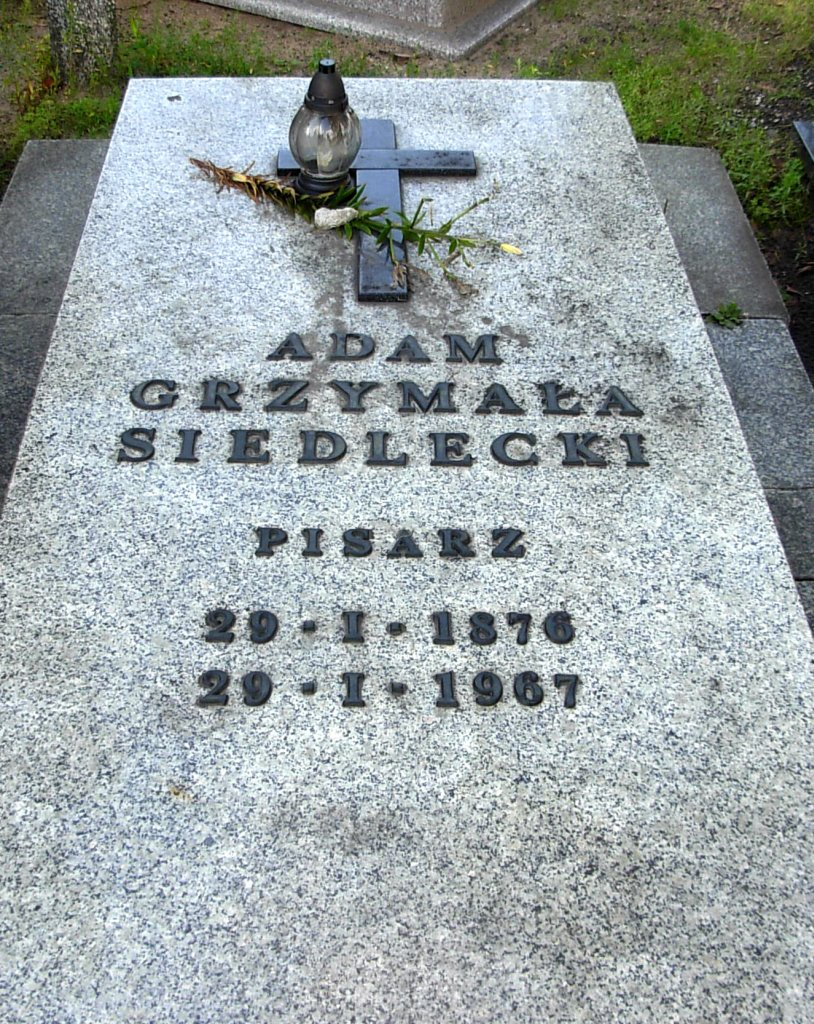
  Adam Grzymała-Siedlecki's tombstone
  "Niepospolici ludzie w dniu swoim powszednim" (Uncommon people in their weekday) (1961), "Na orbicie Melpomeny" (In orbit around Melpomene) (1966), "Tadeusz Pawlikowski i jego krakowscy aktorzy" (Tadeusz Pawlikowski and his Krakow actors) published posthumously (1971).

He was still interested in political affairs. In 1945, he joined the Labour Faction (Polish: Stronnictwo Pracy) and took part in the work of the Polski Komitet Obrońców Pokoju (Polish Committee for the Defenders of Peace).

=== Personal life ===
Adam Grzymała-Siedlecki was married to Maria Szumowska. They had a son, Jacek, a lawyer.

Adam died on 29 January 1967 in Bydgoszcz. He was buried at Bydgoszcz Nowofarny cemetery.

During his second stay, he lived at 5 Libelta street. On 29 January 1968 the Provincial and Municipal Public Library opened an Adam Grzymała-Siedlecki Memorial in the place, tended as a small museum in his memory.

The place exhibits the writer's memorabilia and some materials concerning the history of the theater in Bydgoszcz: posters, programs and photos from theater plays. The flat also houses a theater reading room with a rich book collection devoted to the History of theatre and the Polish theater in particular.

== Works ==
At times, Adam Grzymała-Siedlecki used pseudonyms to sign his books: AGS, Quis, Mus, Franciszek Wierzbiński, Jan z Marnowa.

In addition to the aforementioned, Grzymała-Siedlecki published literary studies and critical articles in the following papers or magazines: Młodość, Życie, Krytyka, Sfinks, Museion, Tygodnik Ilustrowany, Słowo Polski, Czasie, Dziennik Poznański, Rzeczpospolita, Kurier Warszawski.

In complement of the above-mentioned works, Grzymała-Siedlecki also wrote:

- "Stanisław Wyspiański. Cechy i elementy jego twórczości" (Stanisław Wyspiański. Elements of his work) (1909, 2nd edition in 1918);
- studies about Aleksander Fredro (in "Trzy po trzy"-1917), about Władysław Reymont (in "Pisma"-1921), on the aesthetics of Zygmunt Krasiński (in "Myśli o sztuce"-1912), about Adam Szymański (in "Szkicy"-1921);
- chapters from the monographs about Aleksander Fredro in magazines;
- novel "Galeria moich bliźnich" (The Gallery of My Neighbors) (1911, 2nd edition in 1922);
- comedies and farces: "Podatek majątkowy" (Property tax) (1929), "Maman do wzięcia" (Maman to take) (1929), "Pani ministrowa" (Lady Minister) (1930), "Ich synowa" (Their daughter-in-law) (1931) and others.

== Awards and decorations ==
=== Literary Awards ===
- Leon Reynel's award for his lifetime achievements (1934);
- City of Bydgoszcz award for lifetime creative literary work with particular stress on his dramatic achievements at the Bydgoszcz Polski Teatr (1956);
- Bydgoszcz Voivodeship prize for lifetime activity in the field of theater and literature, in particular for his books (1957);
- Władysław Pietrzak award (1964).

=== Decorations ===
- Commander's Cross with Star of the Order of Polonia Restituta, 4 April 1956, in connection with the 60th anniversary of literary activity in the field of drama and theater critic;
- Gold Cross of Merit, 15 June 1946, for outstanding achievements in the field of Theater and Art throughout the country;
- Golden Laurel of the Polish Academy of Literature, 4 November 1937, for outstanding literary work;
- Badge of Meritorious Activist of Culture (1966);
- Honorary badge of Bydgoszcz – Meritorious Citizen (1960);

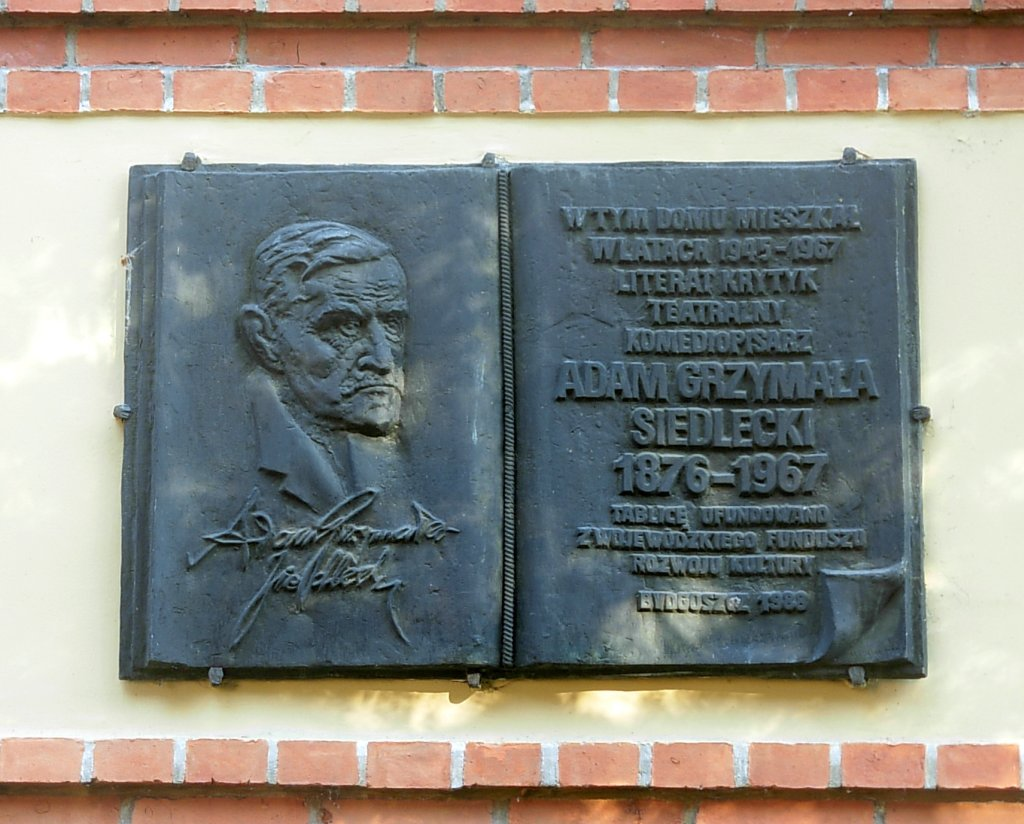
Commemorative Plaque at Grzymały-Siedlecki's last place in Bydgoszcz

- Honorary badge for special contributions to the development of the Bydgoszcz Province.

== Commemorations ==
In 1984, a television movie was shot, inspired by Adam's war memoirs, 111 dni letargu. Wspomnienia z Pawiaka z lat 1942–1943. It was titled 111 dni letargu.

Director was Jerzy Sztwiertnia, the actor Władysław Kowalski played the role of Adam Grzymała-Siedlecki.

One of the streets of Bydgoszcz was named after him, located in the Wyżyny district.

A commemorative plaque designed by Michał Kubiak has been unveiled in 1988, on the frontage of his apartment in Libelta Street, Bydgoszcz.

In 2017, the namesake of Adam Grzymała-Siedlecki has been assigned by plebiscite of Bydgoszcz inhabitants to one of the 18 new tramways purchased by the city.

== See also ==
- Bydgoszcz
- Libelta street in Bydgoszcz
- Witold Bełza
- Theater in Poland
- List of Polish people

== Bibliography ==
- (in Polish) Konieczny, Jerzy (1981). Adam Grzymała-Siedlecki: życie i twórczość. Bydgoszcz: Wydawn. Uczelniane WSP.
- (in Polish) Błażejewski Stanisław, Kutta Janusz, Romaniuk Marek (1995). Bydgoski Słownik Biograficzny. Tom II. Bydgoszcz: Kujawsko-Pomorskie Towarzystwo Kulturalne Wojewódzki Ośrodek Kultury. pp. 42–44. ISBN 8385327274.
- (in Polish) Wielka Ilustrowana Encyklopedia Gutenberga. Kraków: Helge Fergo. 1939. pp. 42–44. ISBN 8385327274.
- (in Polish) Matyasik, Joanna (2014). Izba Pamięci Adama Grzymały-Siedleckiego Wojewódzkiej i Miejskiej Biblioteki Publicznej im. dr. W. Bełzy w Bydgoszczy - historia, działalność, zasób, perspektywy. Kronika Bydgoska XXXV. Bydgoszcz: Towarzystwo Miłosnikow Miasta Bydgoszczy – Bydgoskie Towarzystwo Naukowe. pp. 377–403.
