= Glewiec =

- Village
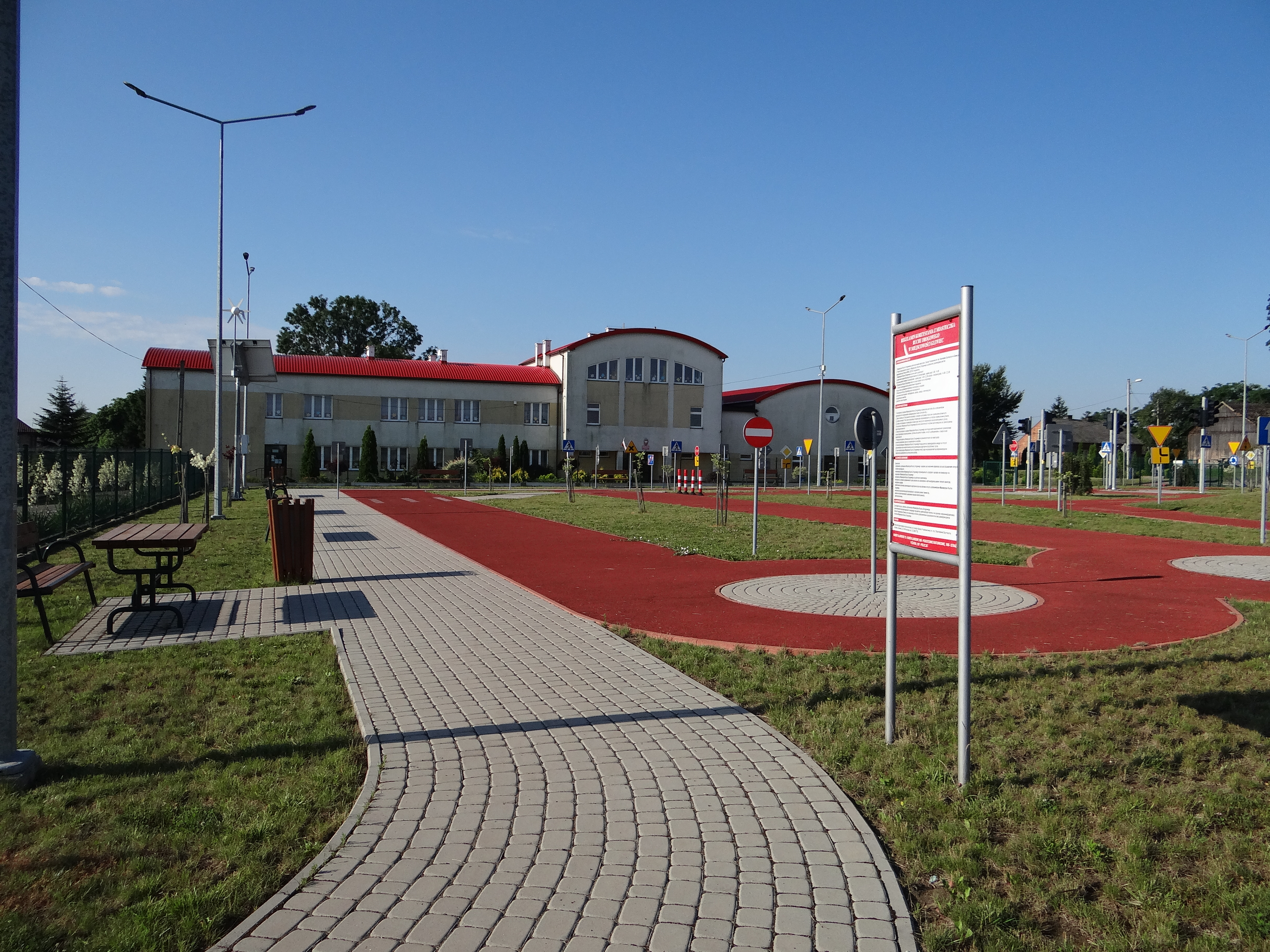
- School

- Location within Poland
- Coordinates: 50°7′46″N 20°13′40″E
- Country: Poland
- Voivodeship: Lesser Poland
- County: Proszowice
- Gmina: Koniusza
- Population: 260

Glewiec [ˈɡlɛvjɛt͡s] is a village in the administrative district of Gmina Koniusza, within Proszowice County, Lesser Poland Voivodeship, in southern Poland.
