= Górka Jaklińska =

- Village
- Location within Poland
- Coordinates: 50°10′N 20°16′E
- Country: Poland
- Voivodeship: Lesser Poland
- County: Proszowice
- Gmina: Koniusza

Górka Jaklińska [ˈɡurka jaˈkliɲska] is a village in the administrative district of Gmina Koniusza, within Proszowice County, Lesser Poland Voivodeship, in southern Poland.
