= Łyszkowice =

Łyszkowice may refer to:

- Łyszkowice, Lesser Poland Voivodeship (south Poland)
- Łyszkowice, Łowicz County in Łódź Voivodeship (central Poland)
- Łyszkowice, Poddębice County in Łódź Voivodeship (central Poland)
- Gmina Łyszkowice, Łowicz County, Łódź Voivodeship, central Poland
