= Wierzbica, Proszowice County =

Wierzbica
- Village
- Location within Poland
- Coordinates: 50°14′38″N 20°8′52″E
- Country: Poland
- Voivodeship: Lesser Poland
- County: Proszowice
- Gmina: Radziemice
- Population: 180

Wierzbica [vjɛʐˈbit͡sa] is a village in the administrative district of Gmina Radziemice, within Proszowice County, Lesser Poland Voivodeship, in southern Poland.
