= Gmina Radziemice =

Gmina Radziemice Radziemice Commune
- Gmina
- Coat of arms
- Interactive map of Gmina Radziemice
- Coordinates (Radziemice): 50°15′N 20°14′E
- Country: Poland
- Voivodeship: Lesser Poland
- County: Proszowice
- Seat: Radziemice

Area
  - Total: 57.85 km^{2} (22.34 sq mi)

Population (2006)
  - Total: 3,442
  - Density: 59.50/km^{2} (154.1/sq mi)
- Website: http://www.radziemice.gmina.pl

Gmina Radziemice is a rural gmina (administrative district) in Proszowice County, Lesser Poland Voivodeship, in southern Poland. Its seat is the village of Radziemice, which lies approximately 8 kilometres (5 mi) north-west of Proszowice and 30 km (19 mi) north-east of the regional capital Kraków.

The gmina covers an area of 57.85 square kilometres (22.3 sq mi), and as of 2006 its total population is 3,442.

== Villages ==
Gmina Radziemice contains the villages and settlements of Błogocice, Dodów, Kaczowice, Kąty, Kowary, Lelowice, Łętkowice, Łętkowice-Kolonia, Obrażejowice, Przemęczanki, Przemęczany, Radziemice, Smoniowice, Wierzbica, Wola Gruszowska, Wrocimowice and Zielenice.

== Neighbouring gminas ==
Gmina Radziemice is bordered by the gminas of Koniusza, Miechów, Pałecznica, Proszowice, Racławice and Słomniki.
