= Biórków Mały =

- Village
- Location within Poland
- Coordinates: 50°09′29″N 20°10′47″E
- Country: Poland
- Voivodeship: Lesser Poland
- County: Proszowice
- Gmina: Koniusza

Biórków Mały [ˈbjurkuf ˈmawɨ] is a village in the administrative district of Gmina Koniusza, within Proszowice County, Lesser Poland Voivodeship, in southern Poland.
