= Łętkowice-Kolonia =

- Village
- Location within Poland
- Coordinates: 50°15′22″N 20°11′45″E
- Country: Poland
- Voivodeship: Lesser Poland
- County: Proszowice
- Gmina: Radziemice

Łętkowice-Kolonia [wɛntkɔˈvit͡sɛ kɔˈlɔɲa] is a village in the administrative district of Gmina Radziemice, within Proszowice County, Lesser Poland Voivodeship, in southern Poland.
