= Wroniec =

Wroniec may refer to:

- Wroniec, Lesser Poland Voivodeship, a village
- Wroniec (book), a novel by Jacek Dukaj
