= Stanisław Tatar =

Polish Army colonel

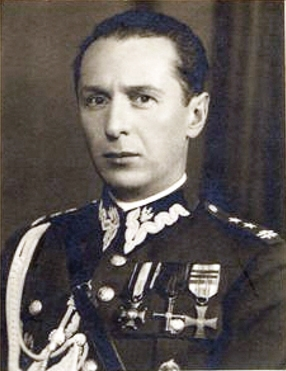
- Lieutenant colonel S. Tatar
- Born: 3 October 1896; Biórków Wielki, Congress Poland
- Died: 16 December 1980 (aged 84); Warsaw, Polish People's Republic
- Burial place: Powązki Military Cemetery
- Military career
- Allegiance: Russian Empire; Second Polish Republic; Polish People's Republic
- Branch: Imperial Russian Army; Polish Armed Forces; Polish Armed Forces in the West; Polish People's Army
- Service years: 1915-1949
- Rank: Generał brygady (Brigadier general)
- Nicknames: Erazm, Tabor, Turski, Warta
- Units: 3rd Legions Light Artillery Regiment; 3rd Legions Infantry Division; 1st Polish Corps; Commander-in-Chief Staff
- Commands: Commander of artillery regiment Commander of divisional artillery Commander of corps artillery Deputy chief of staff of the commander-in-chief
- Conflicts: First World War; Polish-Soviet War; Second World War
- Awards

Stanisław Tatar nom de guerre "Stanisław Tabor" (3 October 1896 – 16 December 1980) was a Polish Army colonel in the interwar period and, during World War II, one of the commanders of Armia Krajowa, Polish resistance movement. He was appointed brigade general in 1943 and half-a-year later flew from occupied Poland to London.

After the war ended, Tatar betrayed the London-based Polish government-in-exile by organising an illegal handover of its vast reserves of money and gold (donated by the nation and called the Fund of National Defense), to the communist regime. The first batch of money was stolen en route by a consul in 1945, yet Tatar went on with his plan in 1947. He came back to Poland in 1949 on the promise of military leadership with LWP, only to be arrested and falsely accused of conspiracy against the party by the Stalinist secret police (Urząd Bezpieczeństwa). Subsequently, Tatar was tried and sentenced to life imprisonment in the so-called Trial of the Generals, but released from prison during Polish October of 1956.

== Biography ==
Tatar was born on 3 October 1896 in Biórków Wielki village in Lesser Poland. In 1915, during World War I, he was conscripted to the tsarist Russian Army. In 1917 he was transferred to the 1st Polish Corps formed in Russia. In November 1918, together with the remnants of his unit, he joined the renascent sovereign Polish Army. During the interbellum he continued serving in the military. Having finished numerous officer courses, in 1934 he became one of the tutors of artillery tactics at the Higher War School (Wyższa Szkoła Wojenna) in Warsaw. He held that post until 1938, given the Knight's Cross of the Order of Polonia Restituta.

During the Invasion of Poland he served at various posts, including the command over a military detachment named after him. After the Polish defeat he evaded being captured by the Germans and Soviets and joined the newly formed Związek Walki Zbrojnej (ZWZ), the biggest resistance organisation, that eventually transformed itself into the Home Army. From 1940 to 1943 he served as the head of the 3rd detachment (Operational) of the general staff. After 1943 he also served as the deputy chief of staff of the entire Home Army. Among his most notable achievements was creation of the plans for Operation Tempest.

In 1944, shortly before the Warsaw Uprising, he was transferred to London, where he assumed the post of deputy commander in chief for home matters. After the end of World War II in 1945 he became the commander of artillery of the 1st Polish Corps in the United Kingdom. After it was disbanded in 1947 he remained in the UK.

=== Fundusz Obrony Narodowej affair ===
In July 1947 Tatar organized the secret transfer to Poland from the London-based Polish government-in-exile of the treasury of the prewar Fund of National Defense (Fundusz Obrony Narodowej, FON). The new Polish government promised to use it to help veterans. Already in 1945 on advice of Jerzy Putrament, Tatar gave Polish communists 100,000 dollars and a hundred gold coins stolen en route to Poland by consul Sobolewski who vanished. The 1947 shipment consisted of gold bars (350 kg) and $2.5 million in gold and silver coins. The 10 metal containers were brought to Warsaw on the 3rd and 13 July by Col. Leon Szwajcer i Pola Landau-Leder from the embassy. Most of it however, was subsequently stolen and split among the Stalinist dignitaries and security forces under Jakub Berman, without leaving a paper trail. Unlike some of his fellow generals of the Polish Army, Stanisław Tatar was not deprived of Polish citizenship by the Soviet-backed communist authorities of Poland and in 1949 was allowed to legally return to his homeland.

Upon his arrival to Warsaw, however, he was arrested by the Soviet NKVD, imprisoned and charged with espionage. As a victim of the Trial of the Generals (show trial) of 1951 he was sentenced to life imprisonment and imprisoned in Wronki Prison. After Joseph Stalin's death and the start of a period of liberalisation in Poland in 1956 he was released from prison and rehabilitated. Tatar died in 1980.

== Awards and decorations ==
- Gold Cross of Virtuti Militari
- Silver Cross of Virtuti Militari (1921)
- Cross of Independence (4 November 1933)
- Officer's Cross of the Order of Polonia Restituta (1948)
- Knight's Cross of the Order of Polonia Restituta (1938)
- Cross of Valour (five times)
- Gold Cross of Merit (19 March 1936)
- Allied Victory Medal
- Order of the Bath (United Kingdom, 1944)
- Officer of the Legion of Honor (France, 1937)
- Order of Saint Anna, 2nd and 3rd Class (Russian Empire)
- Order of Saint Stanislaus, 2nd and 3rd Class (Russian Empire)

== See also ==
- History of Poland (1939-1945)
- Home Army (Armia Krajowa)
- Operation Tempest series of uprisings conducted by the Home Army
