= Karwin, Lesser Poland Voivodeship =

Karwin
- Village
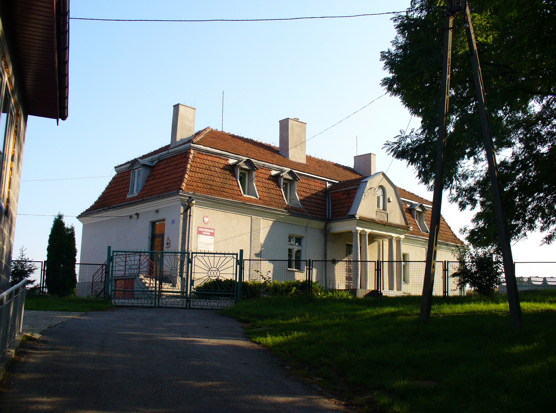
- School

- Location within Poland
- Coordinates: 50°9′N 20°16′E
- Country: Poland
- Voivodeship: Lesser Poland
- County: Proszowice
- Gmina: Koniusza

Karwin [ˈkarvin] is a village in the administrative district of Gmina Koniusza, within Proszowice County, Lesser Poland Voivodeship, in southern Poland.
