= Koniusza, Lesser Poland Voivodeship =

Koniusza
- Village
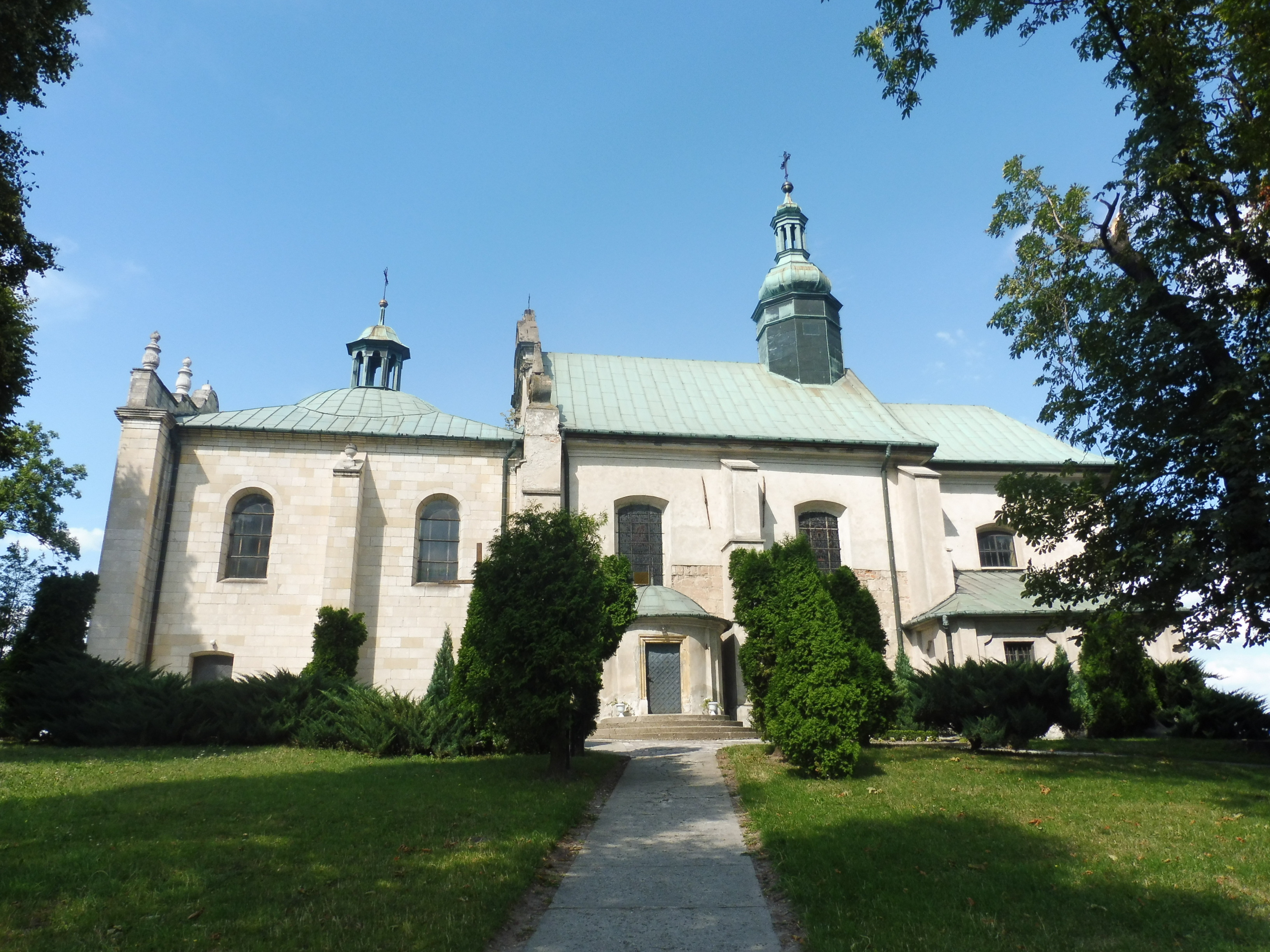
- Church of Saints Peter and Paul

- Coat of arms

- Location within Poland
- Coordinates: 50°12′N 20°14′E
- Country: Poland
- Voivodeship: Lesser Poland
- County: Proszowice
- Gmina: Koniusza

Population
  - Total: 260

Koniusza [kɔˈɲuʂa] is a village in Proszowice County, Lesser Poland Voivodeship, in southern Poland. It is the seat of the gmina (administrative district) called Gmina Koniusza.
