= Radziemice =

- Village
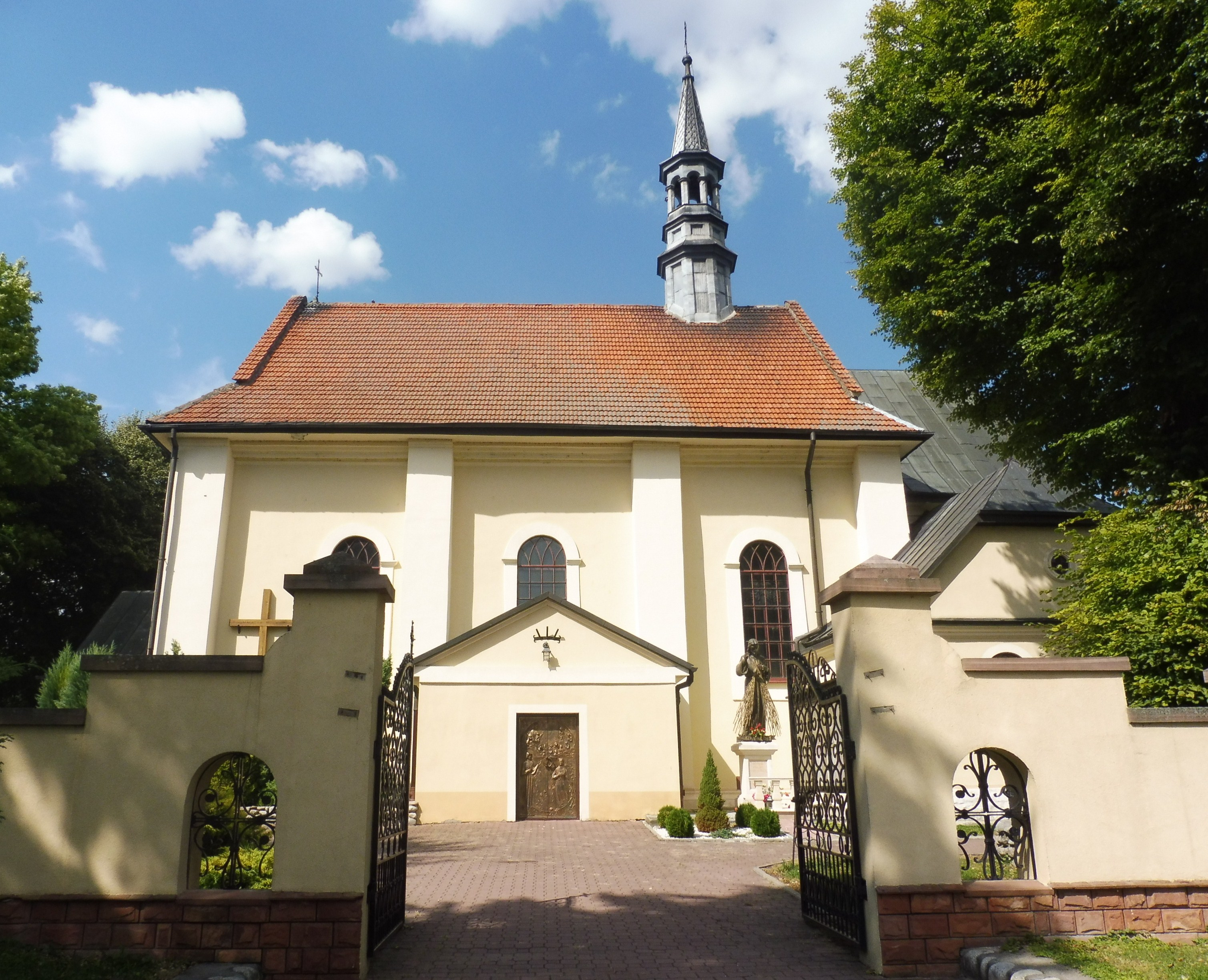
- Church of Saint Stanislaus

- Location within Poland
- Coordinates: 50°15′N 20°14′E
- Country: Poland
- Voivodeship: Lesser Poland
- County: Proszowice
- Gmina: Radziemice

Radziemice [rad͡ʑɛˈmit͡sɛ] is a village in Proszowice County, Lesser Poland Voivodeship, in southern Poland. It is the seat of the gmina (administrative district) called Gmina Radziemice.
