= Łyszkowice, Lesser Poland Voivodeship =

Łyszkowice
- Village
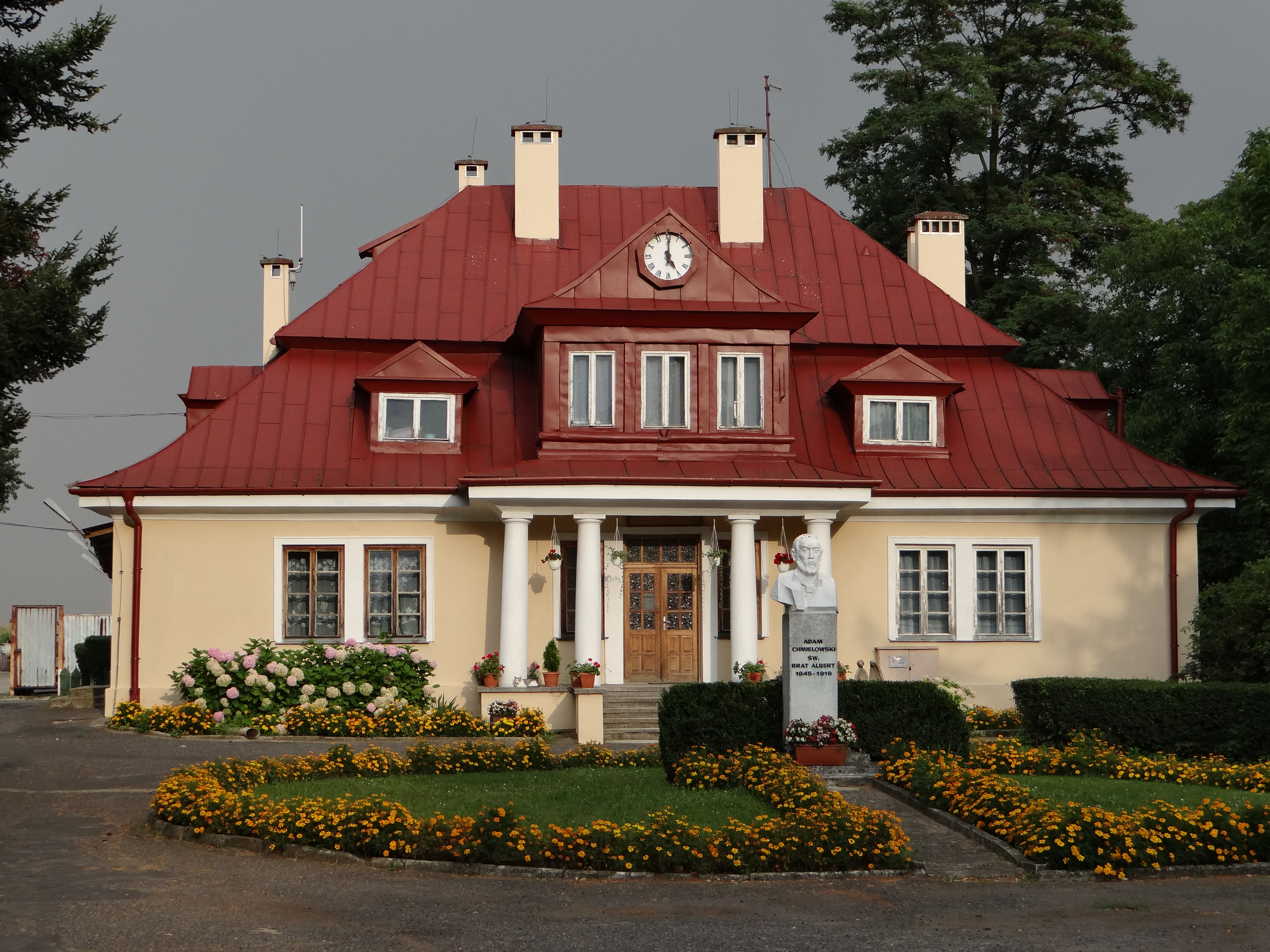
- Former manor, currently nursing home

- Location within Poland
- Coordinates: 50°11′N 20°13′E
- Country: Poland
- Voivodeship: Lesser Poland
- County: Proszowice
- Gmina: Koniusza

Łyszkowice [wɨʂkɔˈvit͡sɛ] is a village in the administrative district of Gmina Koniusza, within Proszowice County, Lesser Poland Voivodeship, in southern Poland.
