= Biórków Wielki =

- Village
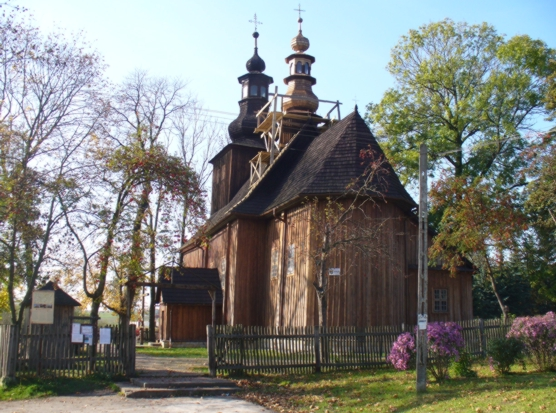
- Catholic church

- Location within Poland
- Coordinates: 50°10′N 20°11′E
- Country: Poland
- Voivodeship: Lesser Poland
- County: Proszowice
- Gmina: Koniusza

Biórków Wielki (Polish pronunciation: [ˈbjurkuv ˈvjɛlkʲi]) is a village in the administrative district of Gmina Koniusza, within Proszowice County, Lesser Poland Voivodeship, in southern Poland.
