= Zielenice, Lesser Poland Voivodeship =

Zielenice
- Village
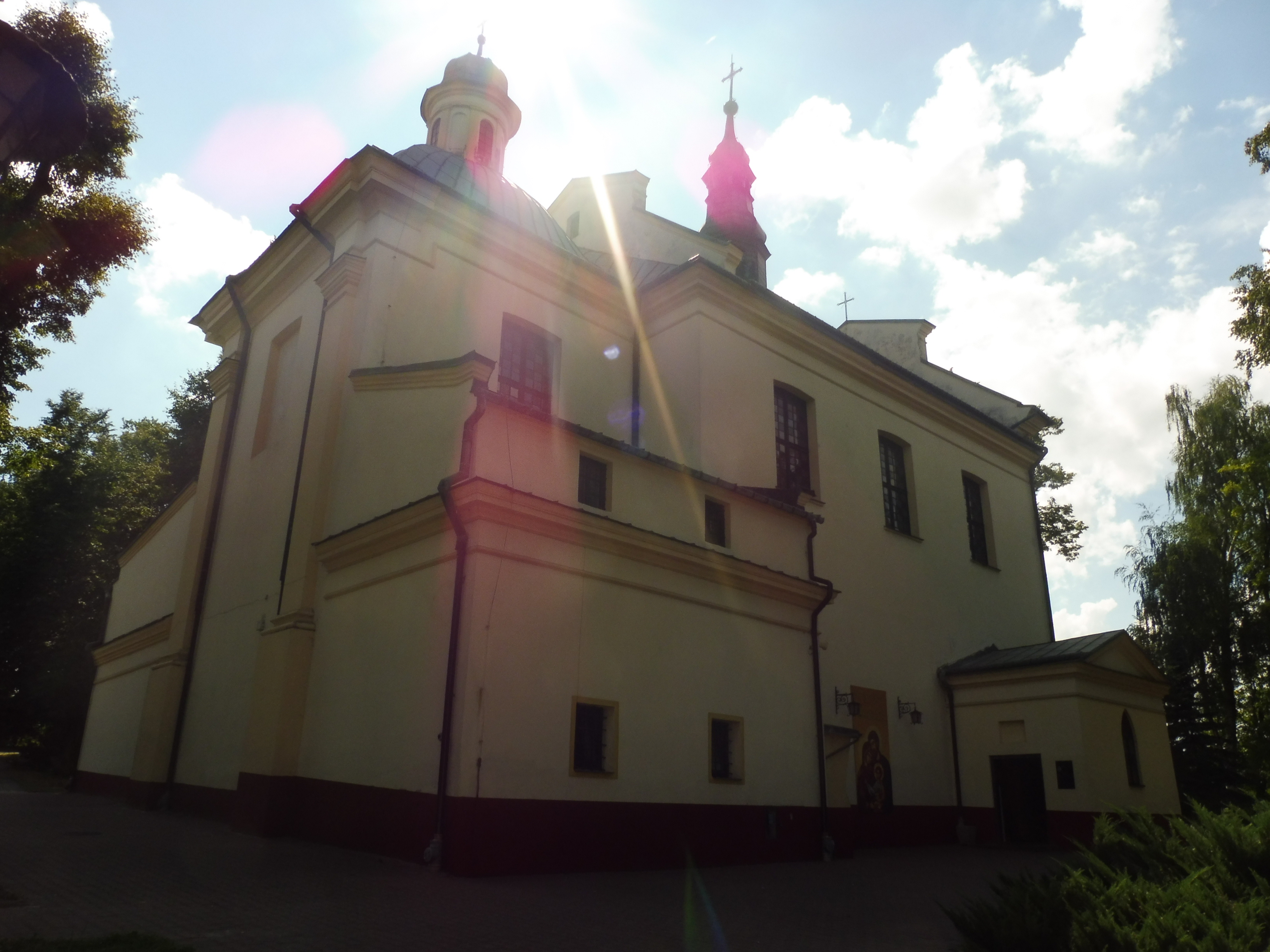

- Location within Poland
- Coordinates: 50°17′16″N 20°11′15″E
- Country: Poland
- Voivodeship: Lesser Poland
- County: Proszowice
- Gmina: Radziemice

Zielenice [ʑɛlɛˈnit͡sɛ] is a village in the administrative district of Gmina Radziemice, within Proszowice County, Lesser Poland Voivodeship, in southern Poland.

== See also ==
- The Lesser Polish Way
