= Wroniec, Lesser Poland Voivodeship =

Wroniec
- Village
- Location within Poland
- Coordinates: 50°09′09″N 20°13′09″E
- Country: Poland
- Voivodeship: Lesser Poland
- County: Proszowice
- Gmina: Koniusza

Wroniec [ˈvrɔɲɛt͡s] is a village in the administrative district of Gmina Koniusza, within Proszowice County, Lesser Poland Voivodeship, in southern Poland.
