= Wierzbno, Lesser Poland Voivodeship =

Wierzbno
- Village
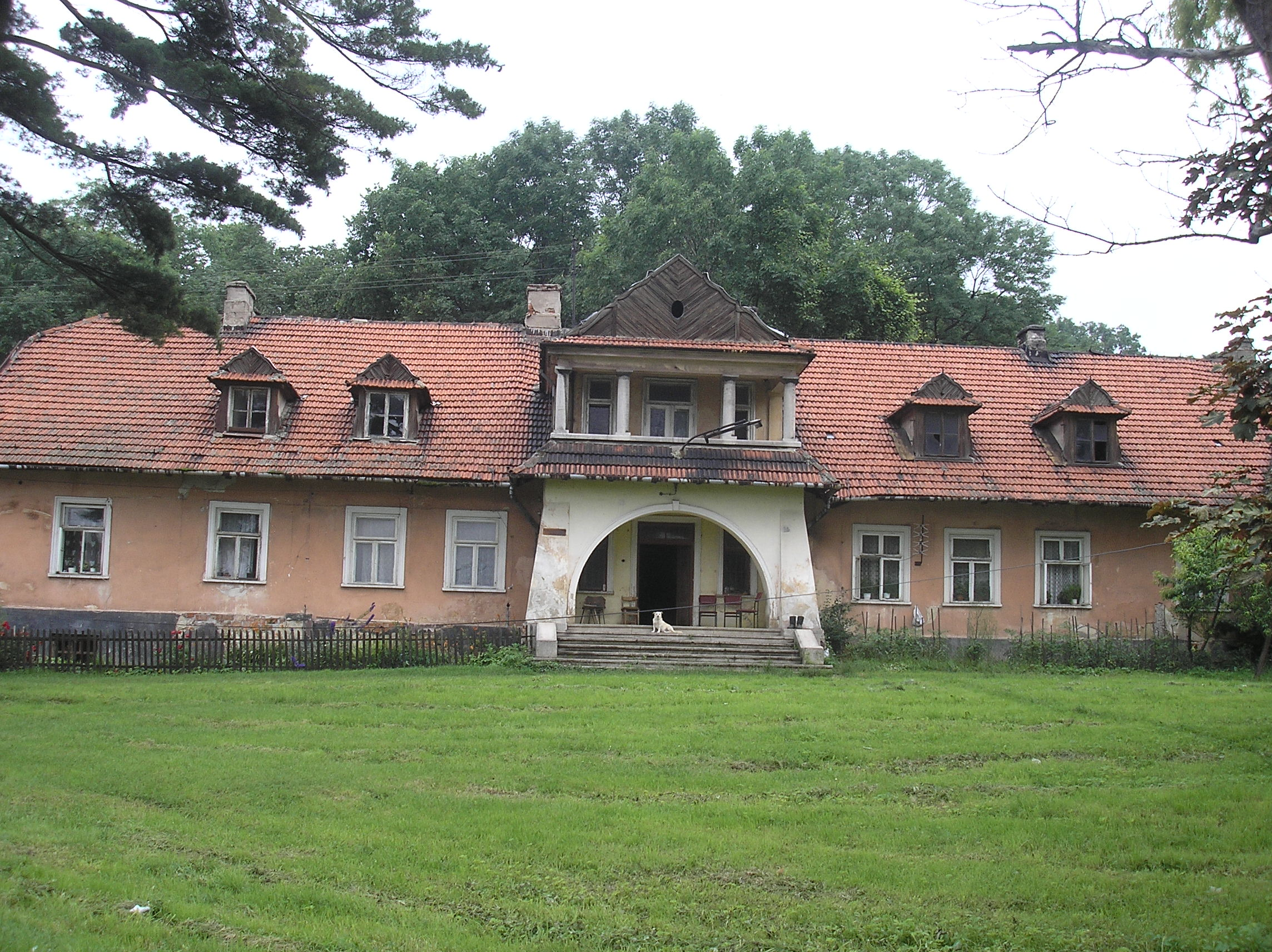
- Manor house

- Location within Poland
- Coordinates: 50°9′N 20°15′E
- Country: Poland
- Voivodeship: Lesser Poland
- County: Proszowice
- Gmina: Koniusza

Wierzbno [ˈvjɛʐbnɔ] is a village in the administrative district of Gmina Koniusza, within Proszowice County, Lesser Poland Voivodeship, in southern Poland.
