= Czernichów, Proszowice County =

Czernichów
- Village
- Location within Poland
- Coordinates: 50°07′11″N 20°13′19″E
- Country: Poland
- Voivodeship: Lesser Poland
- County: Proszowice
- Gmina: Koniusza

Czernichów [t͡ʂɛrˈnixuf] is a village in the administrative district of Gmina Koniusza, within Proszowice County, Lesser Poland Voivodeship, in southern Poland.
