= Proszowice =

Town in Lesser Poland Voivodeship, Poland

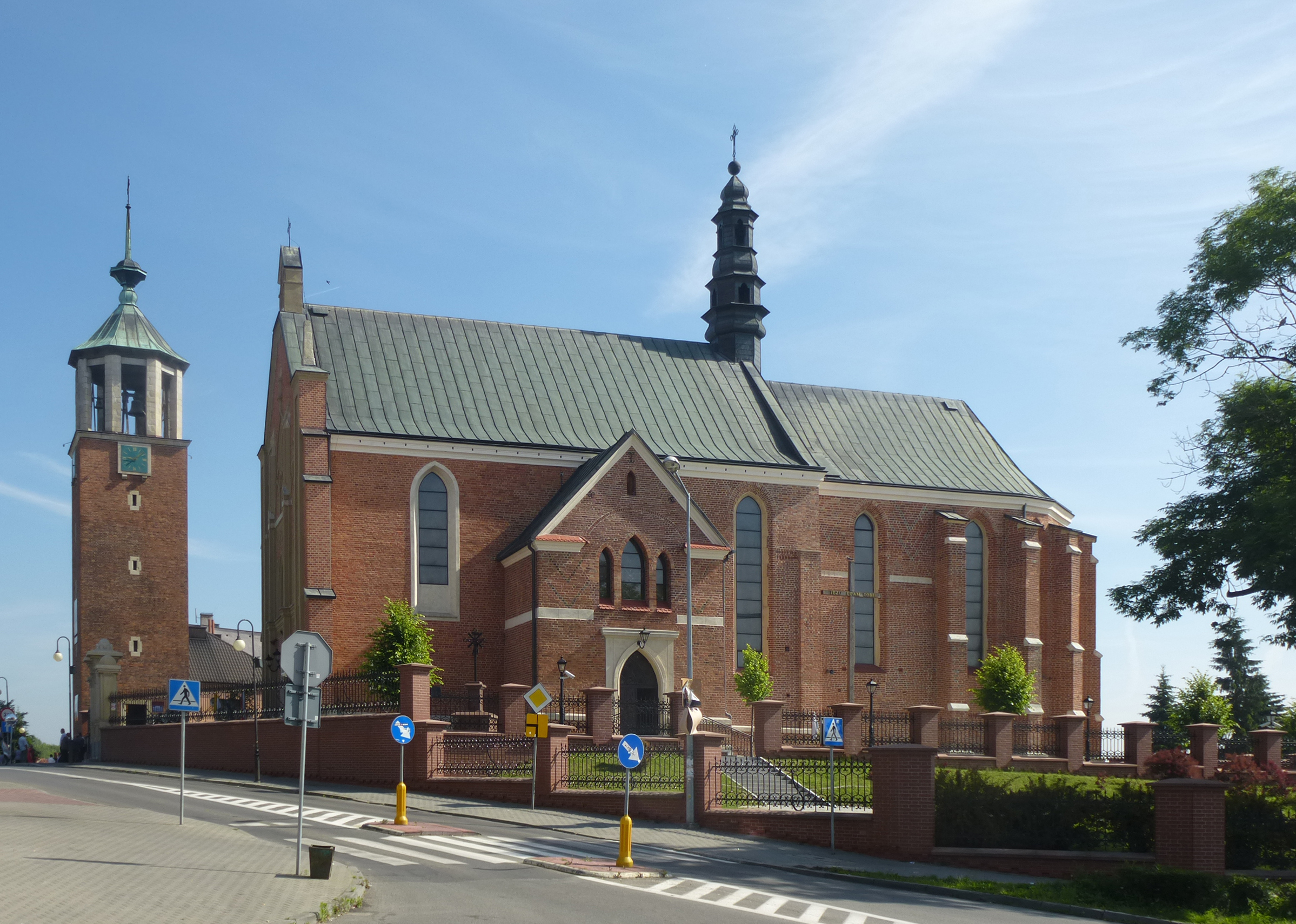
- Church of the Assumption of the Virgin Mary and Saint John the Baptist

- Flag Coat of arms

- Location within Poland
- Coordinates: 50°12′N 20°18′E
- Country: Poland
- Voivodeship: Lesser Poland
- County: Proszowice
- Gmina: Proszowice
- Town rights: 1358

Government
  - Mayor: Grzegorz Cichy

Area
  - Total: 7.21 km^{2} (2.78 sq mi)

Population (2006)
  - Total: 6,205
  - Density: 861/km^{2} (2,230/sq mi)
- Time zone: UTC+1 (CET)
  - Summer (DST): UTC+2 (CEST)
- Postal code: 32–100
- Car plates: KPR
- Website: Official page

Proszowice [prɔʂɔˈvʲit͡sɛ] is a town in southern Poland, situated in the Lesser Poland Voivodeship. Its population numbers 6,206 inhabitants (2004). It is the capital of Proszowice County, and the town is located some 25 kilometers northeast of Kraków, on the right bank of the Szreniawa river.

== History ==
Royal document from 1518 of Sigismund I the Old establishing three annual fairs in Proszowice

First mention about the village of Proszowice comes from 1222. The origin of its name is not known, probably the village was named after a knight named Proszkomir, who lived here. By 1240, Proszowice already had a brick church of St. John the Baptist. The village was privately owned, and in the mid-14th century it became royal property of King Casimir III the Great, who granted it town charter in 1358. The King greatly contributed to the development of Proszowice, building here a palace, which for some time was one of the royal residences (later on, its role was taken on by the Niepołomice Castle). Proszowice prospered due to several royal privileges. A number of artisans lived here, there was a parish school, and the period from the early 15th century to the early 17th century is regarded as Golden Age of the town, which was one of the most important centers of Kraków Voivodeship; here sejmiks took place. King Casimir IV Jagiellon initiated the construction of a new church, which was finished in 1454 and was among most impressive Gothic churches in Lesser Poland. Here, Stańczyk, the legendary court jester was born, and in the 16th century, Proszowice became one of centers of Protestant Reformation. All Catholic churches in the area were turned into Calvinist or Polish Brethren prayer houses, but later on, the Counter-Reformation prevailed. In 1616, the town was almost completely burned in a fire. Like almost all towns of Lesser Poland, Proszowice was destroyed in the Swedish invasion of Poland (1655–1660).

The town was annexed by Austria in the Third Partition of Poland in 1795. After the Polish victory in the Austro-Polish War of 1809, it became part of the short-lived Duchy of Warsaw, and after the duchy's dissolution in 1815, it became part of Russian-controlled Congress Poland. During January Uprising, several skirmishes took place in the area of the town, and as a punishment, the Russians reduced Proszowice to the status of a village (1869). According to the 1921 census, the town had a population of 3,297, 80.1% Polish and 19.9% Jewish by declared nationality. In 1923, already in Kielce Voivodeship of the Second Polish Republic, Proszowice regained its town charter.

Following the German-Soviet invasion of Poland, which started World War II in September 1939, the town was occupied by Germany. The Polish resistance movement was active in the town, including a local unit of the Home Army under the cryptonym "Przepiórka" ("Quail"). On 28 July 1944, the town was liberated by the partisans of the Home Army, and then formed part of the short-lived Polish "Kazimierza-Proszowice Partisan Republic".

From 1975 to 1998, it was administratively located in the Kraków Voivodeship. In 1999 the town became the seat of a county.

== Architecture ==
The center of Proszowice is of typical medieval shape, with a market square and streets radiating from it. Houses in the market square, however, are modern, most of them were built in the 20th century. Once there was a town hall, which was dismantled in the mid-19th century. Local parish church was first erected in the 13th century, during the reign of Prince Bolesław V the Chaste. The first church burned between 1306 and 1308. New complex was built in 1325, and most likely, it burned in a fire in 1407. Third parish church was completed in 1454. It was partly destroyed after a storm in May 1824, when one of the walls collapsed, together with the Gothic vault. The reconstruction took 12 years.

== Sports ==
Proszowice has a sports club Proszowianka, established in 1916.
