= Proszowice County =

Proszowice County Powiat proszowicki
- County
- Flag Coat of arms

- Location within the voivodeship
- Coordinates (Proszowice): 50°12′N 20°18′E
- Country: Poland
- Voivodeship: Lesser Poland
- Seat: Proszowice
- Gminas: Total 6: Gmina Koniusza; Gmina Koszyce; Gmina Nowe Brzesko; Gmina Pałecznica; Gmina Proszowice; Gmina Radziemice

Area
  - Total: 414.57 km^{2} (160.07 sq mi)

Population (2006)
  - Total: 43,441
  - Density: 104.79/km^{2} (271.39/sq mi)
  - Urban: 6,205
  - Rural: 37,236
- Car plates: KPR
- Website: www.proszowice.upow.gov.pl

Proszowice County (Polish: powiat proszowicki) is a unit of territorial administration and local government (powiat) in the Lesser Poland Voivodeship, southern Poland. It came into being on January 1, 1999, as a result of the Polish local government reforms passed in 1998. Its administrative seat is Proszowice, which lies 31 kilometres (19 mi) north-east of the regional capital Kraków. Its only other town is Nowe Brzesko (since 2011).

The county covers an area of 414.57 square kilometres (160.1 sq mi). As of 2006 its total population is 43,441, out of which the population of Proszowice was 6,205 and the rural population was 37,236.

== Neighbouring counties ==
Proszowice County is bordered by Kazimierza County and Tarnów County to the east, Brzesko County to the south-east, Bochnia County to the south, Kraków County to the south and west, and Miechów County to the north-west.

== Administrative division ==
The county is subdivided into six gminas (two urban-rural and four rural). These are listed in the following table, in descending order of population.

Gmina	Type	Area (km²)	Population (2006)	Seat
Gmina Proszowice	urban-rural	99.8	16,188	Proszowice
Gmina Koniusza	rural	88.5	8,663	Koniusza
Gmina Nowe Brzesko	urban-rural	54.5	5,769	Nowe Brzesko
Gmina Koszyce	rural	66.0	5,649	Koszyce
Gmina Pałecznica	rural	48.0	3,730	Pałecznica
Gmina Radziemice	rural	57.9	3,442	Radziemice

== Proszowice County in the past ==
The history of Proszowice County dates back to the early 16th century, when it was created. Until the Partitions of Poland, the county was part of Kraków Voivodeship. It had the area of 2880 sq. kilometers, with 15 towns, including Kraków, Będzin, Chrzanów, Olkusz, Sławków, Działoszyce, Słomniki and Nowe Brzesko.

Proszowice County was disbanded by Austrian authorities in 1794, and most of its territory was merged into District of Miechów. From 1815 until 1916, most of former county belonged to Russian-controlled Congress Poland. Separated by Austro-Russian border from the city of Kraków, the region stagnated, with Proszowice losing its town charter in 1864.

In the Second Polish Republic, Proszowice regained town rights in 1923, but was not named seat of a county. After World War II, Proszowice belonged to Miechów County until 1954, when Proszowice County was recreated. It existed until 1975 when all counties were disbanded (see Administrative division of the Polish People's Republic).
