= Zakrzów =

Zakrzów may refer to:

- Zakrzów, Oleśnica County in Lower Silesian Voivodeship (south-west Poland)
- Zakrzów, Oława County
- Zakrzów, Gmina Środa Śląska in Środa County, Lower Silesian Voivodeship (south-west Poland)
- Zakrzów, Łódź Voivodeship (central Poland)
- Zakrzów, Łęczna County in Lublin Voivodeship (east Poland)
- Zakrzów, Gmina Łaziska in Opole County, Lublin Voivodeship (east Poland)
- Zakrzów, Tarnów County in Lesser Poland Voivodeship (south Poland)
- Zakrzów, Wadowice County in Lesser Poland Voivodeship (south Poland)
- Zakrzów, Wieliczka County in Lesser Poland Voivodeship (south Poland)
- Zakrzów, Jędrzejów County in Świętokrzyskie Voivodeship (south-central Poland)
- Zakrzów, Kazimierza County in Świętokrzyskie Voivodeship (south-central Poland)
- Zakrzów, Pińczów County in Świętokrzyskie Voivodeship (south-central Poland)
- Zakrzów, Sandomierz County in Świętokrzyskie Voivodeship (south-central Poland)
- Zakrzów, Włoszczowa County in Świętokrzyskie Voivodeship (south-central Poland)
- Zakrzów, Kędzierzyn-Koźle County in Opole Voivodeship (south-west Poland)
- Zakrzów, Krapkowice County in Opole Voivodeship (south-west Poland)
- Zakrzów, Tarnobrzeg, Podkarpackie Voivodeship
