= Boszczynek =

- Village
- Location within Poland
- Coordinates: 50°17′N 20°26′E
- Country: Poland
- Voivodeship: Świętokrzyskie
- County: Kazimierza
- Gmina: Skalbmierz

Boszczynek [bɔʂˈt͡ʂɨnɛk] is a village in the administrative district of Gmina Skalbmierz, within Kazimierza County, Świętokrzyskie Voivodeship, in south-central Poland. It lies 6 km (4 mi) south of Skalbmierz, 4 km (2 mi) west of Kazimierza Wielka, and 68 km (42 mi) south of the regional capital Kielce.
