= Krępice =

Krępice may refer to the following places in Poland:

- Krępice, Lower Silesian Voivodeship (south-west Poland)
- Krępice, Świętokrzyskie Voivodeship (south-central Poland)
