= Podgaje, Kazimierza County =

Podgaje
- Village
- Location within Poland
- Coordinates: 50°20′29″N 20°22′41″E
- Country: Poland
- Voivodeship: Świętokrzyskie
- County: Kazimierza
- Gmina: Skalbmierz

Podgaje [pɔdˈɡajɛ] is a village in the administrative district of Gmina Skalbmierz, within Kazimierza County, Świętokrzyskie Voivodeship, in south-central Poland. It lies approximately 3 km (2 mi) west of Skalbmierz, 11 km (7 mi) north-west of Kazimierza Wielka, and 63 km (39 mi) south of the regional capital Kielce.
