= Sielec-Kolonia =

- Village
- Location within Poland
- Coordinates: 50°20′22″N 20°25′27″E
- Country: Poland
- Voivodeship: Świętokrzyskie
- County: Kazimierza
- Gmina: Skalbmierz

Sielec-Kolonia [ˈɕɛlɛt͡s kɔˈlɔɲa] is a village in the administrative district of Gmina Skalbmierz, within Kazimierza County, Świętokrzyskie Voivodeship, in south-central Poland. It lies approximately 1 km (1 mi) north-east of Skalbmierz, 9 km (6 mi) north-west of Kazimierza Wielka, and 62 km (39 mi) south of the regional capital Kielce.
