= Tempoczów-Kolonia =

- Village
- Location within Poland
- Coordinates: 50°19′14″N 20°20′0″E
- Country: Poland
- Voivodeship: Świętokrzyskie
- County: Kazimierza
- Gmina: Skalbmierz

Tempoczów-Kolonia [tɛmˈpɔt͡ʂuf kɔˈlɔɲa] is a village in the administrative district of Gmina Skalbmierz, within Kazimierza County, Świętokrzyskie Voivodeship, in south-central Poland. It lies approximately 7 km (4 mi) west of Skalbmierz, 12 km (7 mi) north-west of Kazimierza Wielka, and 66 km (41 mi) south of the regional capital Kielce.
