= Zakrzówek, Świętokrzyskie Voivodeship =

Zakrzówek
- Village
- Location within Poland
- Coordinates: 50°18′0″N 20°21′40″E
- Country: Poland
- Voivodeship: Świętokrzyskie
- County: Kazimierza
- Gmina: Skalbmierz

Zakrzówek [zaˈkʂuvɛk] is a village in the administrative district of Gmina Skalbmierz, within Kazimierza County, Świętokrzyskie Voivodeship, in south-central Poland. It lies approximately 6 km (4 mi) south-west of Skalbmierz, 10 km (6 mi) west of Kazimierza Wielka, and 68 km (42 mi) south of the regional capital Kielce.
