= Przybenice =

- Village
- Location within Poland
- Coordinates: 50°16′N 20°24′E
- Country: Poland
- Voivodeship: Świętokrzyskie
- County: Kazimierza
- Gmina: Skalbmierz

Przybenice [pʂɨbɛˈnit͡sɛ] is a village in the administrative district of Gmina Skalbmierz, within Kazimierza County, Świętokrzyskie Voivodeship, in south-central Poland. It lies approximately 8 km (5 mi) south of Skalbmierz, 7 km (4 mi) west of Kazimierza Wielka, and 71 km (44 mi) south of the regional capital Kielce.
