= Grodzonowice =

- Village
- Location within Poland
- Coordinates: 50°20′53″N 20°26′13″E
- Country: Poland
- Voivodeship: Świętokrzyskie
- County: Kazimierza
- Gmina: Skalbmierz

Grodzonowice [ɡrɔd͡zɔnɔˈvit͡sɛ] is a village in the administrative district of Gmina Skalbmierz, within Kazimierza County, Świętokrzyskie Voivodeship, in south-central Poland. It lies approximately 3 km (2 mi) north-east of Skalbmierz, 9 km (6 mi) north of Kazimierza Wielka, and 61 km (38 mi) south of the regional capital Kielce.
