= Drożejowice =

- Village
- Location within Poland
- Coordinates: 50°21′N 20°25′E
- Country: Poland
- Voivodeship: Świętokrzyskie
- County: Kazimierza
- Gmina: Skalbmierz

Drożejowice [drɔʐɛjɔˈvit͡sɛ] is a village in the administrative district of Gmina Skalbmierz, within Kazimierza County, Świętokrzyskie Voivodeship, in south-central Poland. It lies approximately 2 km (1 mi) north of Skalbmierz, 10 km (6 mi) north-west of Kazimierza Wielka, and 61 km (38 mi) south of the regional capital Kielce.

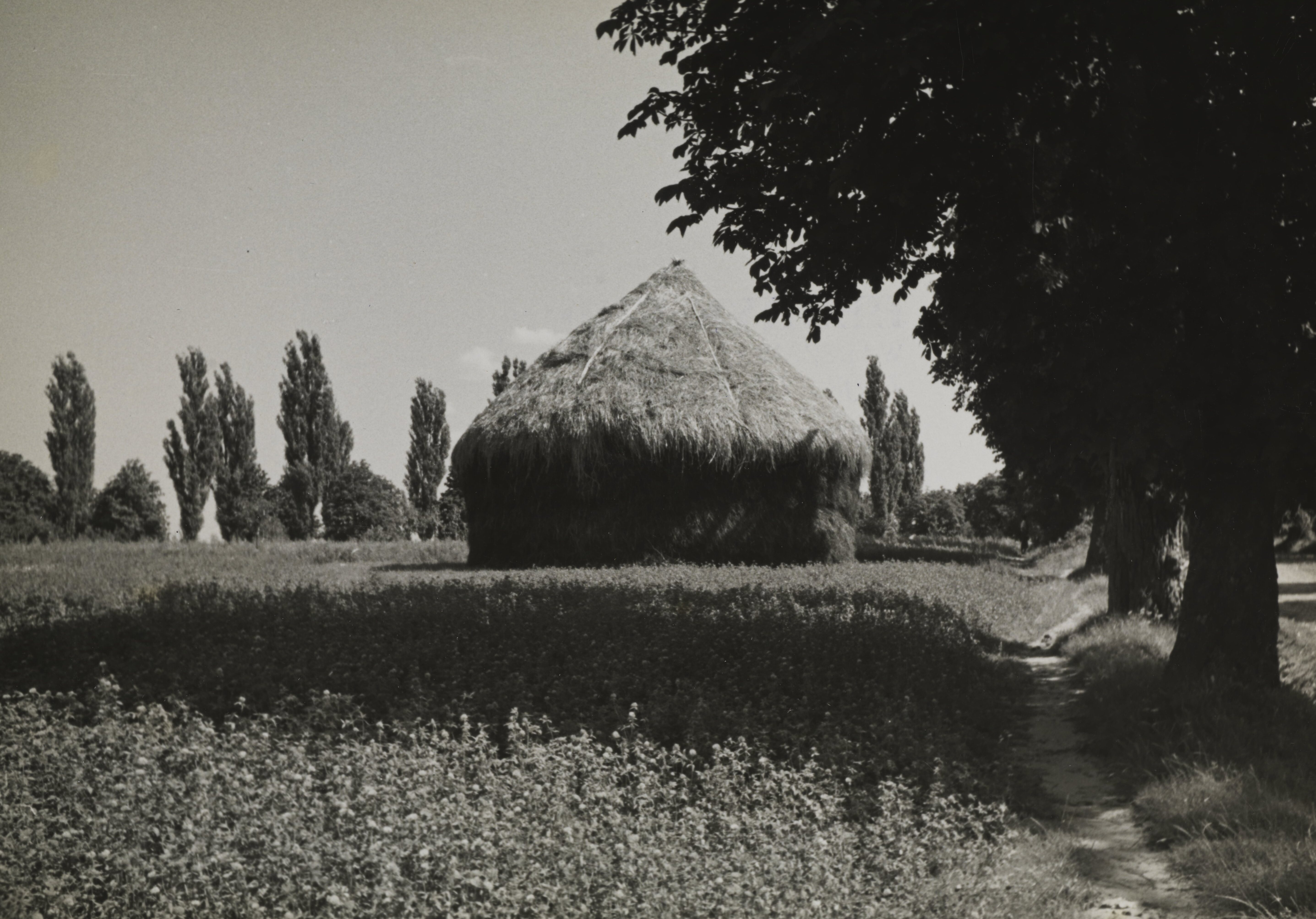
Landscape near Drożejowice, circa 1936
