= Topola, Kazimierza County =

Topola
- Village
- Location within Poland
- Coordinates: 50°18′N 20°27′E
- Country: Poland
- Voivodeship: Świętokrzyskie
- County: Kazimierza
- Gmina: Skalbmierz
- Population: 1,100
- Website: http://zstopola.pl

Topola [tɔˈpɔla] is a village in the administrative district of Gmina Skalbmierz, within Kazimierza County, Świętokrzyskie Voivodeship, in south-central Poland. It lies approximately 5 km (3 mi) south-east of Skalbmierz, 4 km (2 mi) north-west of Kazimierza Wielka, and 66 km (41 mi) south of the regional capital Kielce.
