= Bolowiec =

- Village
- Location within Poland
- Coordinates: 50°16′14″N 20°21′14″E
- Country: Poland
- Voivodeship: Świętokrzyskie
- County: Kazimierza
- Gmina: Skalbmierz

Bolowiec [bɔˈlɔvjɛt͡s] is a village in the administrative district of Gmina Skalbmierz, within Kazimierza County, Świętokrzyskie Voivodeship, in south-central Poland. It lies about 9 km (6 mi) south-west of Skalbmierz, 10 km (6 mi) west of Kazimierza Wielka, and 71 km (44 mi) south of the regional capital Kielce.
