= Baranów, Kazimierza County =

Baranów
- Village
- Location within Poland
- Coordinates: 50°17′35″N 20°21′13″E
- Country: Poland
- Voivodeship: Świętokrzyskie
- County: Kazimierza
- Gmina: Skalbmierz

Baranów [baˈranuf] is a village in the administrative district of Gmina Skalbmierz, within Kazimierza County, Świętokrzyskie Voivodeship, in south-central Poland. It lies approximately 7 km (4 mi) south-west of Skalbmierz, 10 km (6 mi) west of Kazimierza Wielka, and 69 km (43 mi) south of the regional capital Kielce.
