= Kózki, Świętokrzyskie Voivodeship =

Kózki
- Village
- Location within Poland
- Coordinates: 50°17′57″N 20°24′6″E
- Country: Poland
- Voivodeship: Świętokrzyskie
- County: Kazimierza
- Gmina: Skalbmierz

Kózki [ˈkuski] is a village in the administrative district of Gmina Skalbmierz, within Kazimierza County, Świętokrzyskie Voivodeship, in south-central Poland. It lies approximately 4 km (2 mi) south of Skalbmierz, 7 km (4 mi) north-west of Kazimierza Wielka, and 67 km (42 mi) south of the regional capital Kielce.
