= Rosiejów =

- Village
- Location within Poland
- Coordinates: 50°20′N 20°19′E
- Country: Poland
- Voivodeship: Świętokrzyskie
- County: Kazimierza
- Gmina: Skalbmierz

Rosiejów [rɔˈɕɛjuf] is a village in the administrative district of Gmina Skalbmierz, within Kazimierza County, Świętokrzyskie Voivodeship, in south-central Poland. It lies approximately 8 km (5 mi) west of Skalbmierz, 14 km (9 mi) north-west of Kazimierza Wielka, and 65 km (40 mi) south of the regional capital Kielce.
