= Sielec Biskupi =

- Village
- Location within Poland
- Coordinates: 50°18′39″N 20°24′56″E
- Country: Poland
- Voivodeship: Świętokrzyskie
- County: Kazimierza
- Gmina: Skalbmierz

Sielec Biskupi [ˈɕɛlɛt͡s bisˈkupi] is a village in the administrative district of Gmina Skalbmierz, within Kazimierza County, Świętokrzyskie Voivodeship, in south-central Poland. It lies approximately 3 km (2 mi) south of Skalbmierz, 7 km (4 mi) north-west of Kazimierza Wielka, and 66 km (41 mi) south of the regional capital Kielce.
