= Małoszów, Świętokrzyskie Voivodeship =

Małoszów
- Village
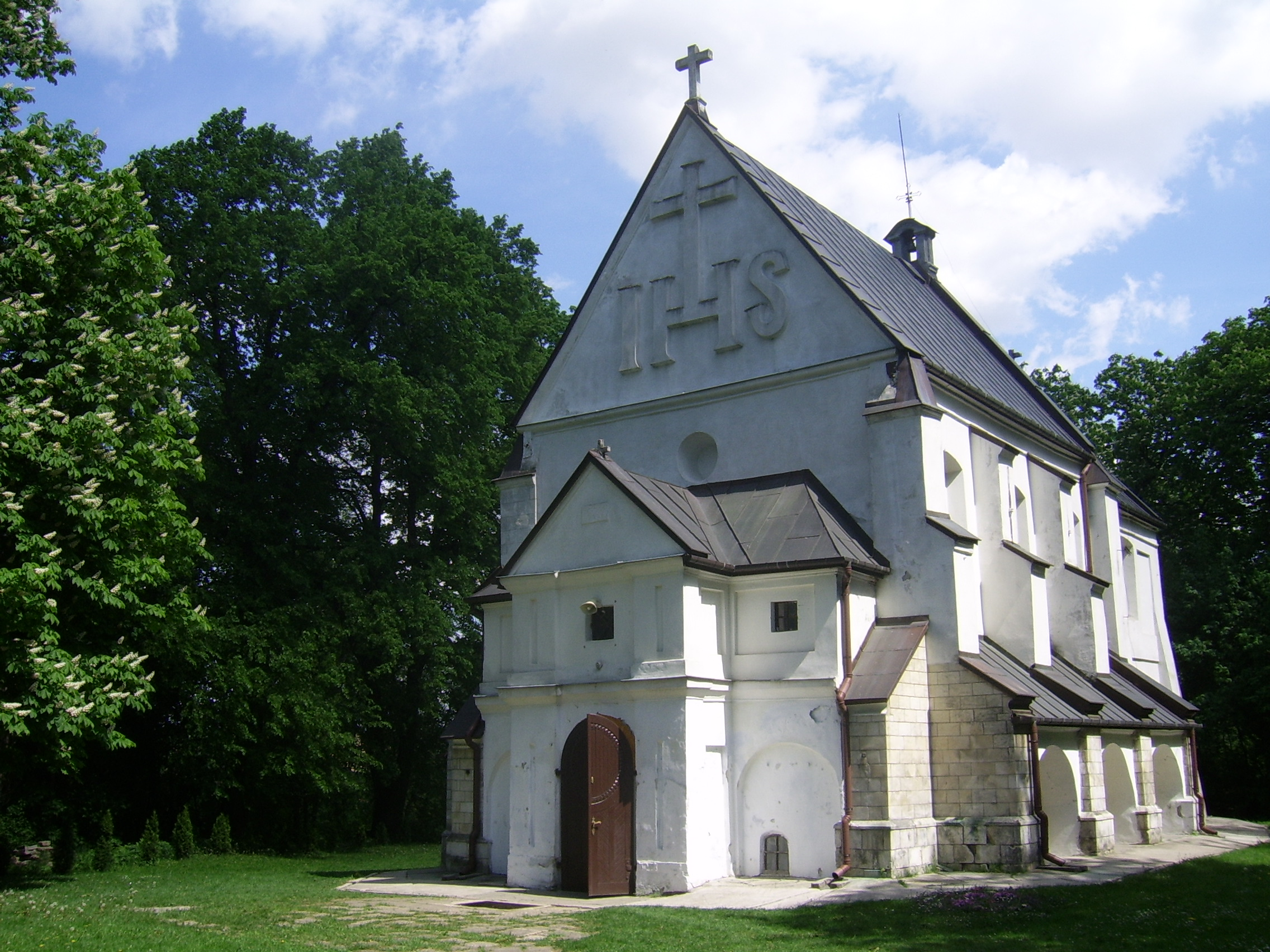
- Catholic church

- Location within Poland
- Coordinates: 50°16′30″N 20°22′1″E
- Country: Poland
- Voivodeship: Świętokrzyskie
- County: Kazimierza
- Gmina: Skalbmierz

Małoszów [maˈwɔʂuf] is a village in the administrative district of Gmina Skalbmierz, within Kazimierza County, Świętokrzyskie Voivodeship, in south-central Poland. It lies approximately 8 km (5 mi) south-west of Skalbmierz, 9 km (6 mi) west of Kazimierza Wielka, and 70 km (43 mi) south of the regional capital Kielce.
