= Kobylniki, Kazimierza County =

Kobylniki
- Village
- Location within Poland
- Coordinates: 50°19′33″N 20°26′40″E
- Country: Poland
- Voivodeship: Świętokrzyskie
- County: Kazimierza
- Gmina: Skalbmierz

Kobylniki [kɔbɨlˈniki] is a village in the administrative district of Gmina Skalbmierz, within Kazimierza County, Świętokrzyskie Voivodeship, in south-central Poland. It lies approximately 3 km (2 mi) south-east of Skalbmierz, 7 km (4 mi) north-west of Kazimierza Wielka, and 64 km (40 mi) south of the regional capital Kielce.
