= Tempoczów-Rędziny =

- Village
- Location within Poland
- Coordinates: 50°18′41″N 20°21′38″E
- Country: Poland
- Voivodeship: Świętokrzyskie
- County: Kazimierza
- Gmina: Skalbmierz

Tempoczów-Rędziny [tɛmˈpɔt͡ʂuf rɛnˈd͡ʑinɨ] is a village in the administrative district of Gmina Skalbmierz, within Kazimierza County, Świętokrzyskie Voivodeship, in south-central Poland. It lies approximately 5 km (3 mi) south-west of Skalbmierz, 10 km (6 mi) north-west of Kazimierza Wielka, and 66 km (41 mi) south of the regional capital Kielce.
