= Trzciniec culture =

Bronze Age archaeological culture in Eastern Europe

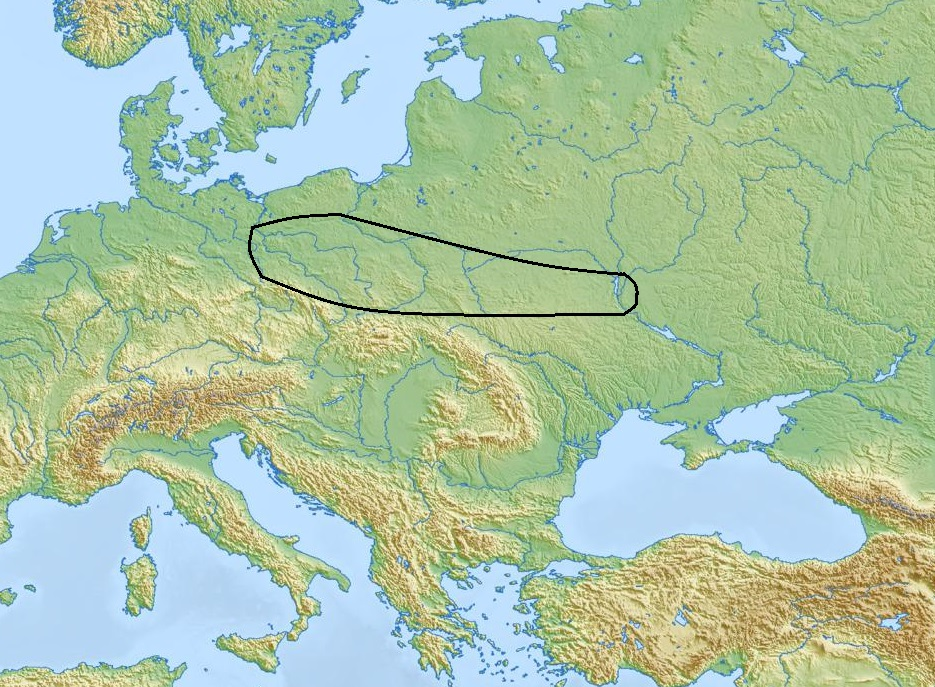
- Geographical range: central and eastern Poland, western Ukraine, western Belarus
- Period: Bronze Age Europe
- Dates: ca. 2400–1300 BC
- Preceded by: Mierzanowice culture, Únětice culture, Iwno culture, Comb Ceramic culture, Multi-cordoned ware culture
- Followed by: Lusatian culture, Urnfield culture

The Trzciniec culture is an Early and Middle Bronze Age (2400-1300 BC) archaeological culture in Central-Eastern Europe, mainly Poland and parts of Lithuania. The material culture similarity and overall chronological contemporaneity with Komarov (Ukraine) and Sośnica (Belarus) cultures resulted in the definition of the Trzciniec-Komaróv-Sośnica complex or, more recently, the Trzciniec Cultural Circle. In Poland, the archaeological sites of the Trzciniec culture are found in Central, Southern, and Eastern Poland (Kuyavia, Lesser Poland, Mazovia, Podlachia, and Lublin Upland).

== History ==
Trzciniec culture was first identified by Włodzimierz Antoniewicz, who named it "band pottery culture". The term "Trzciniec culture" from the eponymous site Trzciniec near Opole Lubelskie was introduced by Józef Kostrzewski in 1930. The first complete monograph of the Trzciniec culture was written by Aleksander Gardawski. From a cultural-historical perspective, the origins of the Trzciniec culture are associated with three Corded Ware-related cultures: Mierzanowice, Strzyżów and Iwno. In general, the Trzciniec culture was succeeded by the Lusatian culture.

== Characteristics ==
Decorated bronze diadem from Dratów, Poland

The best known settlements of the Trzciniec culture were in Złota Pińczowska, Więcławice Świętokrzyskie, Goszyce, and west Bondyrz, close to the kurgans of Guciów. Some of these sites include important treasures containing materials such as ornamental gold and silver like in Stawiszyce and Rawa Mazowiecka.

Burial rite of the Trzciniec culture is characterized by regional preferences in using inhumation and cremation. Cases of inhumation were discovered in Wolica Nowa, in the form of kurgans. Evidence of kurgan inhumation have been found at Łubna-Jakusy, whereas kurgan cremation has been found at Guciów.

There is evidence for the use of chariots by the Trzciniec culture. There is also evidence for patrilocality.

A decorated bronze diadem with a central solar cross motif from Dratów in Poland, belonging to the Trzciniec culture, is a unique find from central Europe in this period.

== Genetics ==
Mittnik et al. (2018) examined the remains of seven possible Trzciniec individuals buried in Turlojiškė, Lithuania between 2,100 BC and 600 BC. The three samples of Y-DNA extracted belonged to haplogroup R1a1a1b (two samples) and CT, while the seven samples of mtDNA extracted belonged to haplogroup U5a2a1, T2b (three samples), H5, H4a1a1a3, and H.

Juras et al. (2020) examined the mtDNA of eighty individuals ascribed to the Trzciniec culture. The individuals were determined to be closely related to peoples of the Corded Ware culture, Bell Beaker culture, Únětice culture, and the Mierzanowice culture. They were notably genetically different from peoples of the neighboring Strzyżów culture, which displayed closer genetic relations to cultures further east.

== Gallery ==
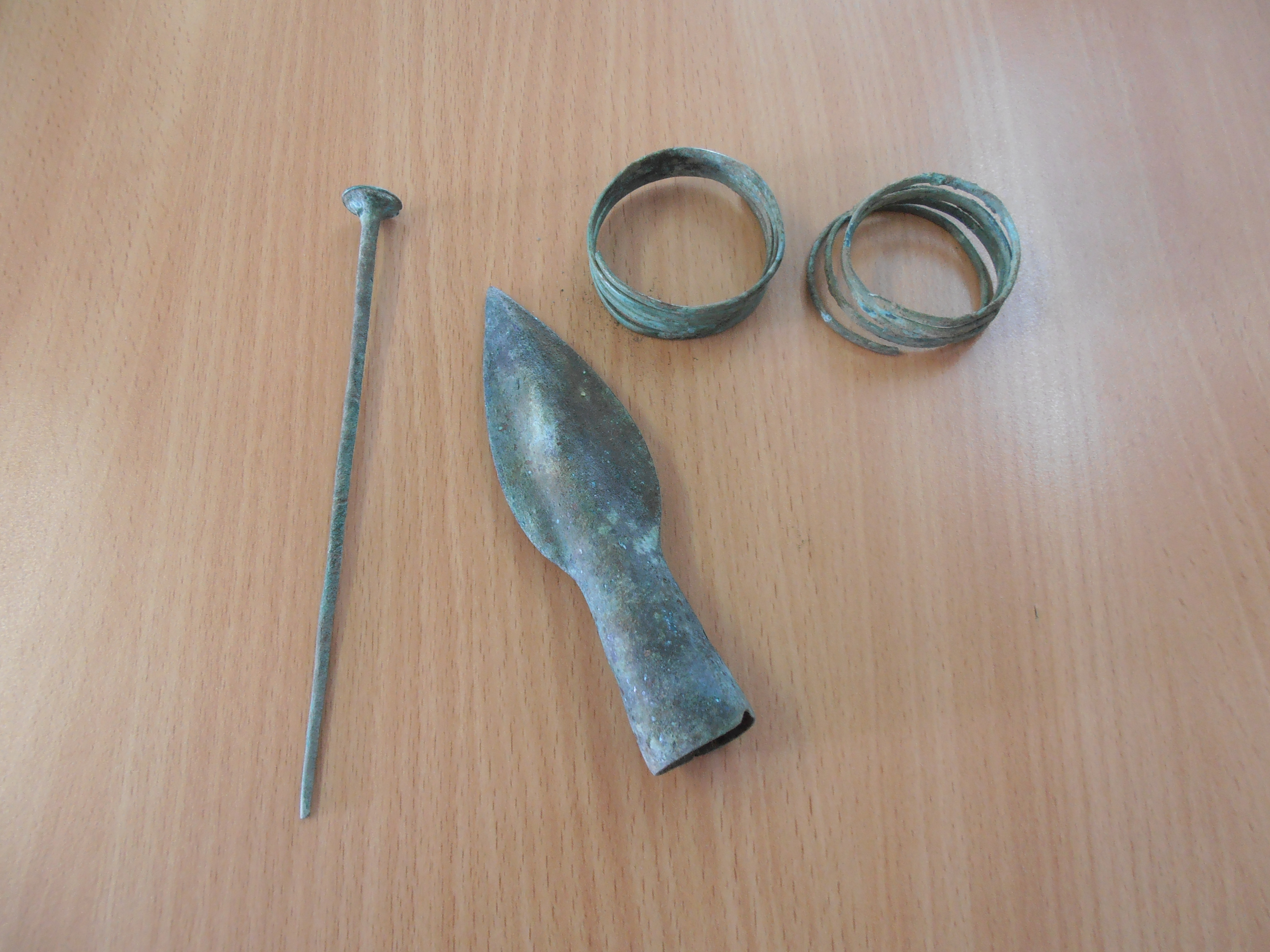
Bronze spearhead, clothing pin and bracelets

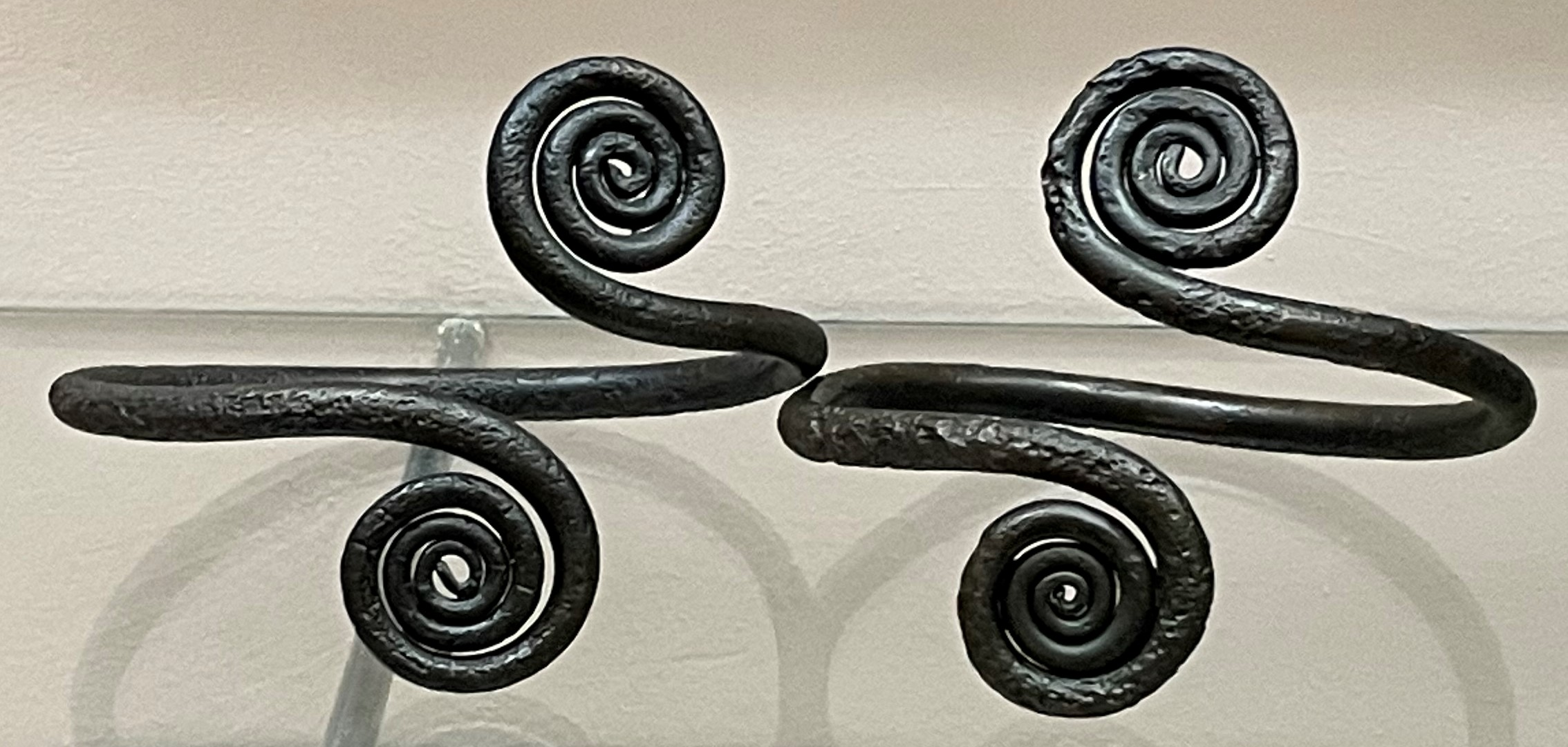
Bronze armbands

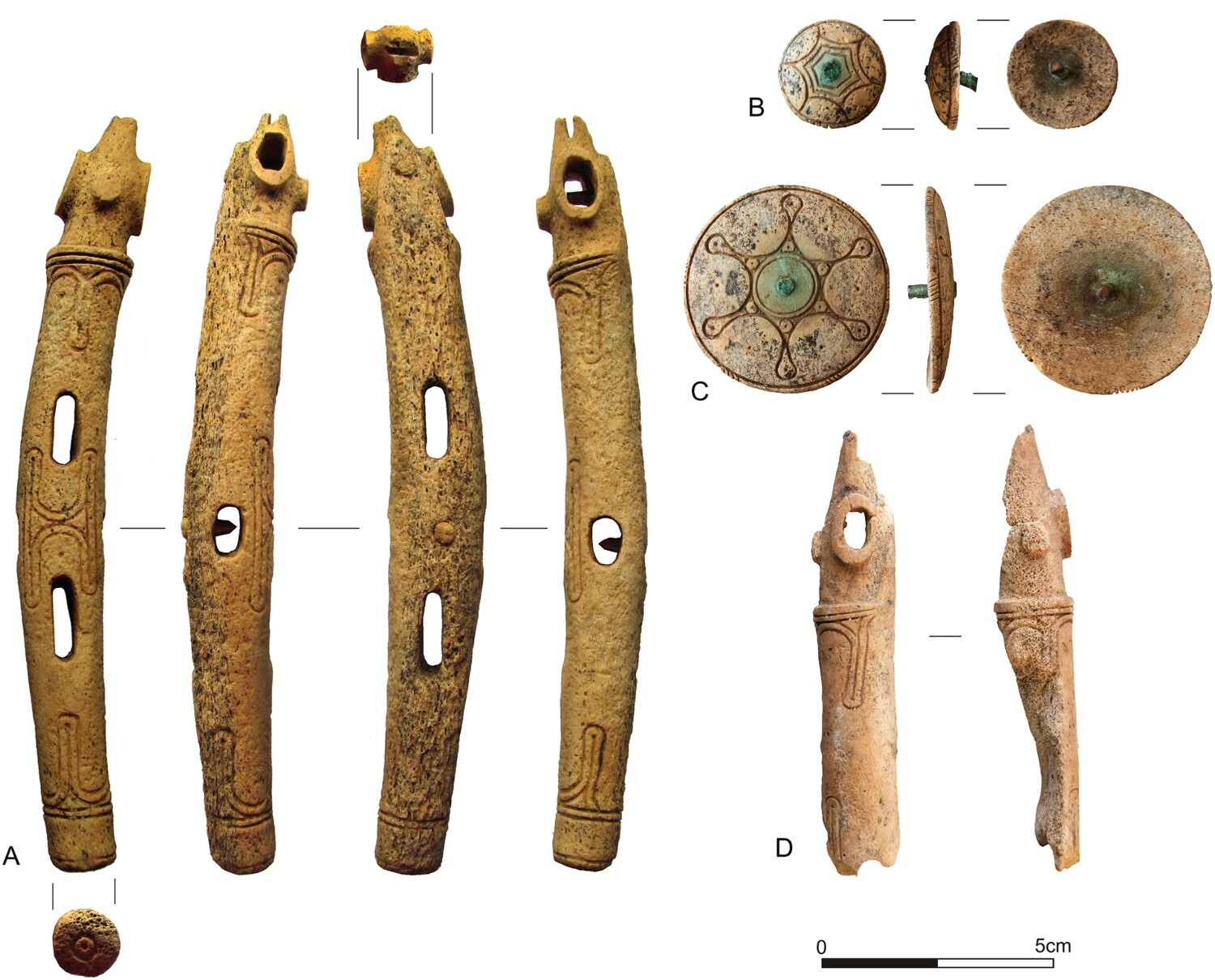
Horse bridle items made from antler

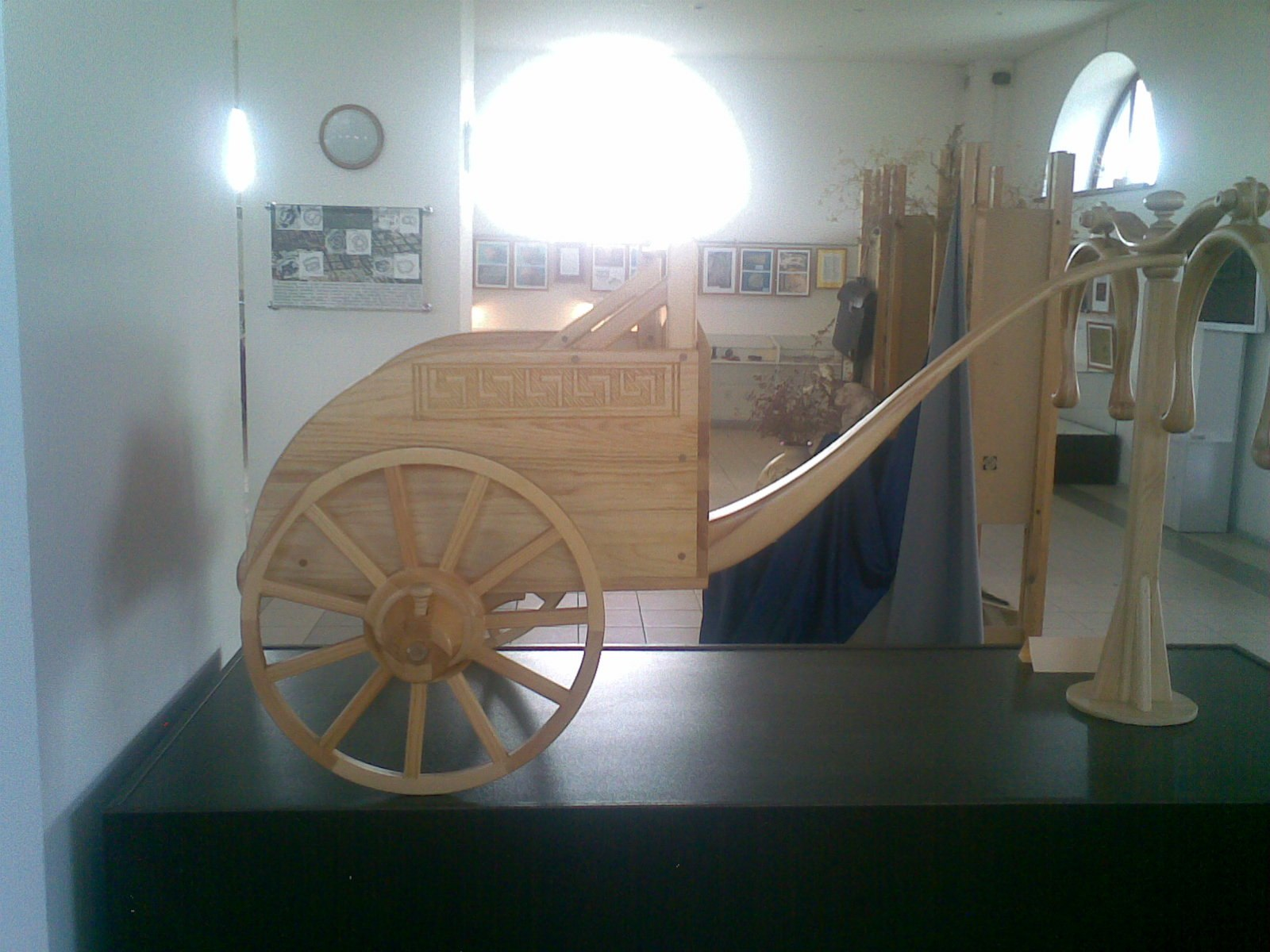
Chariot model, Arkaim museum

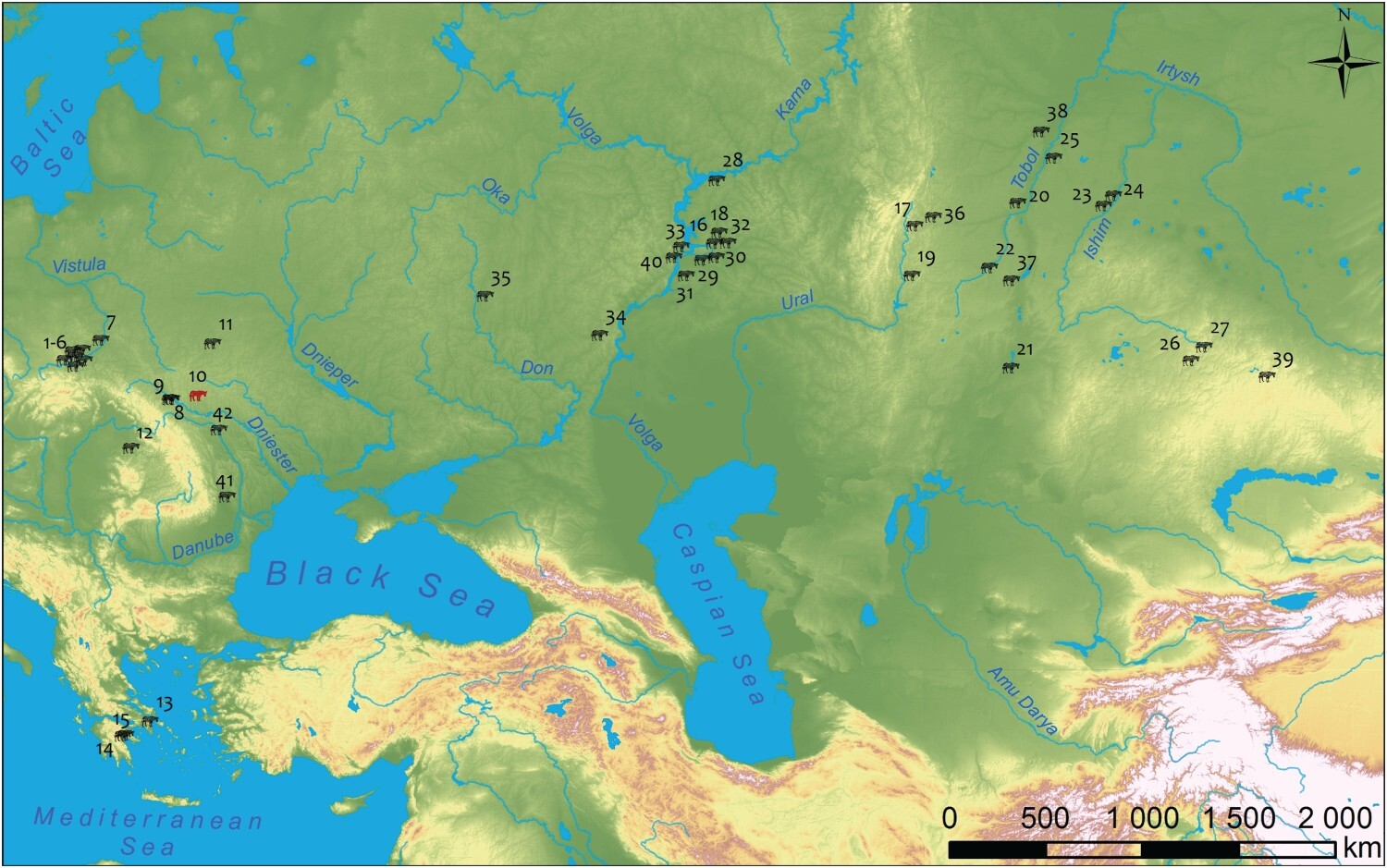
Double-horse burials 2000–1300 BC, associated with the spread of chariots

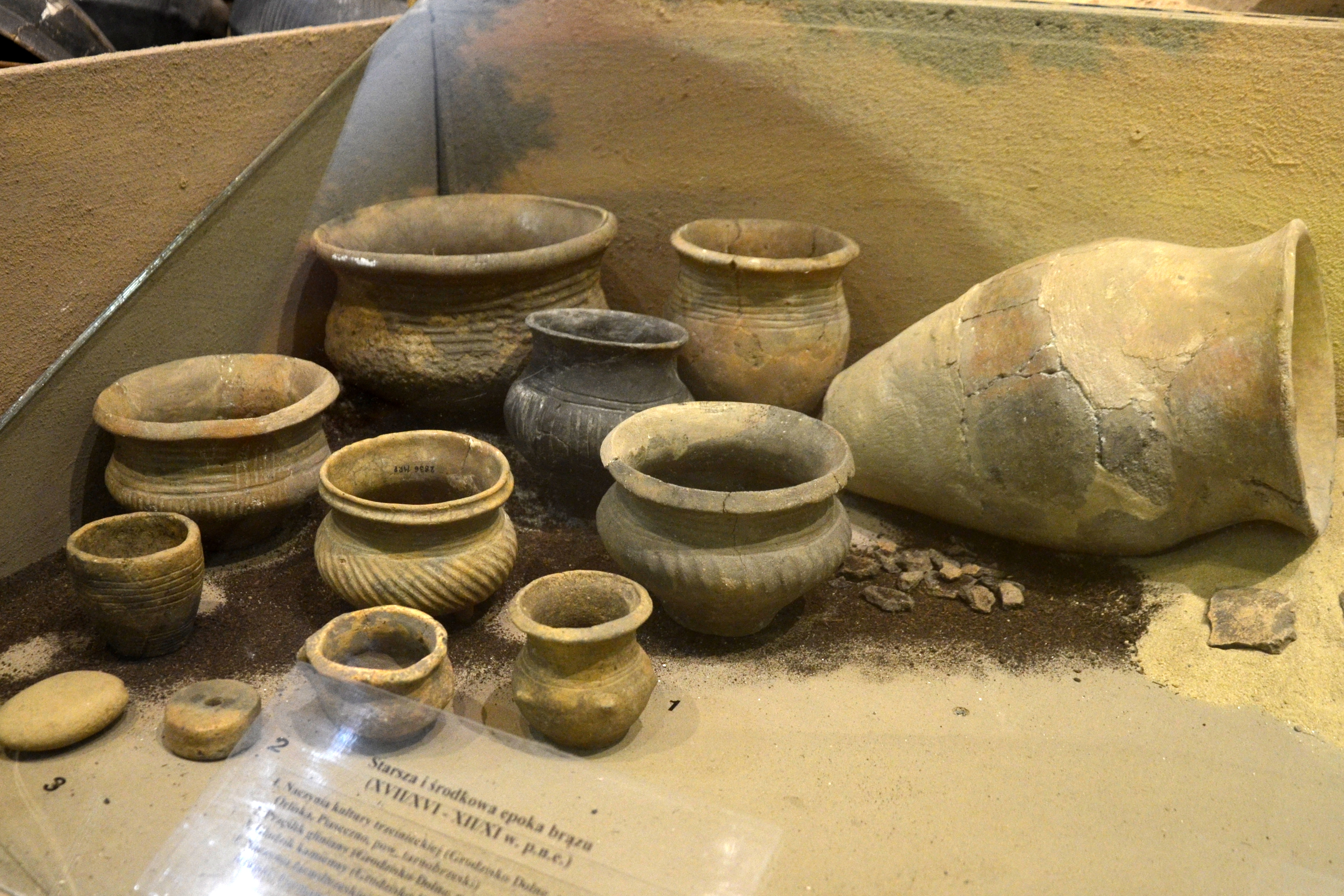
Pottery

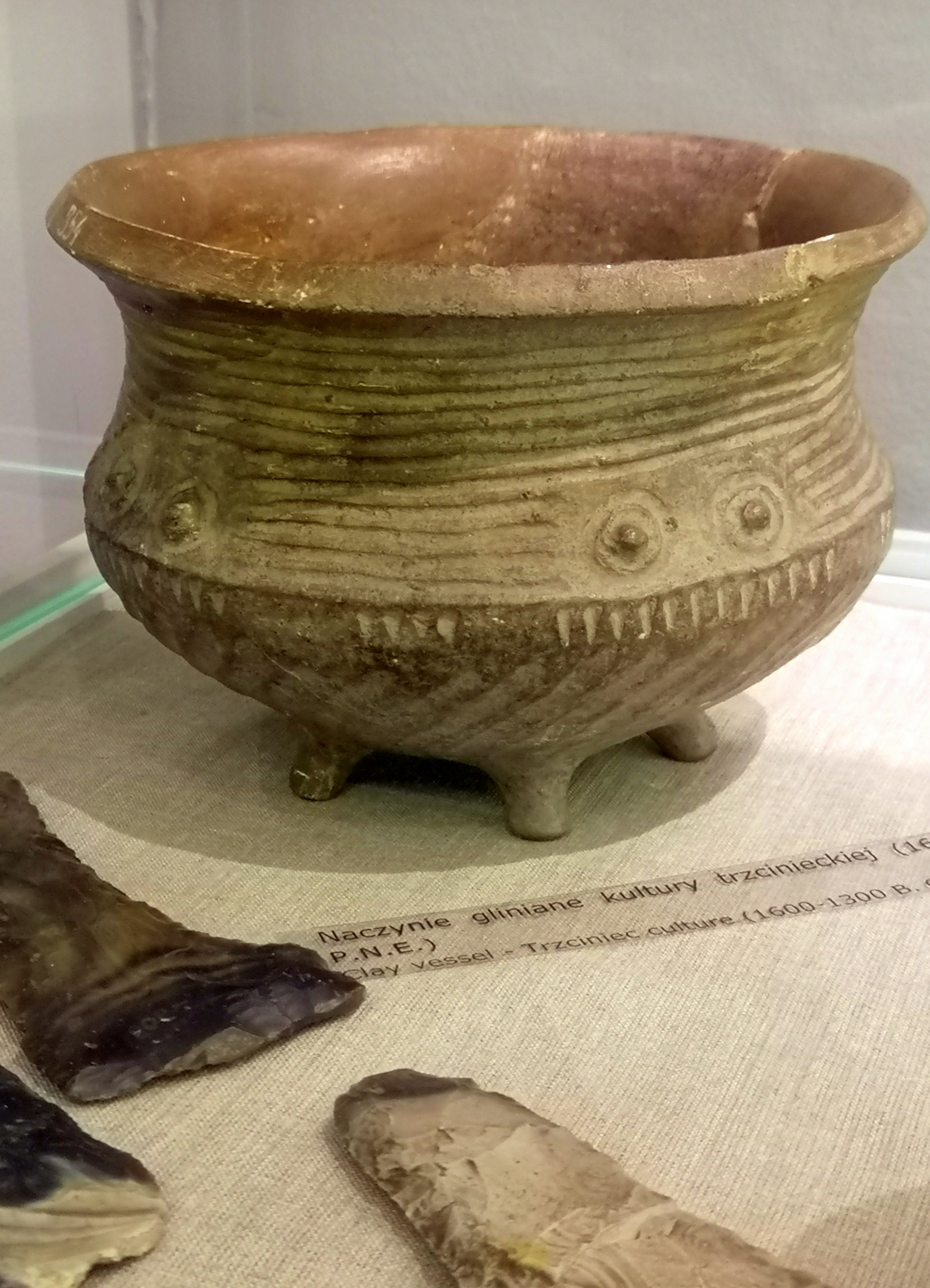
Pottery

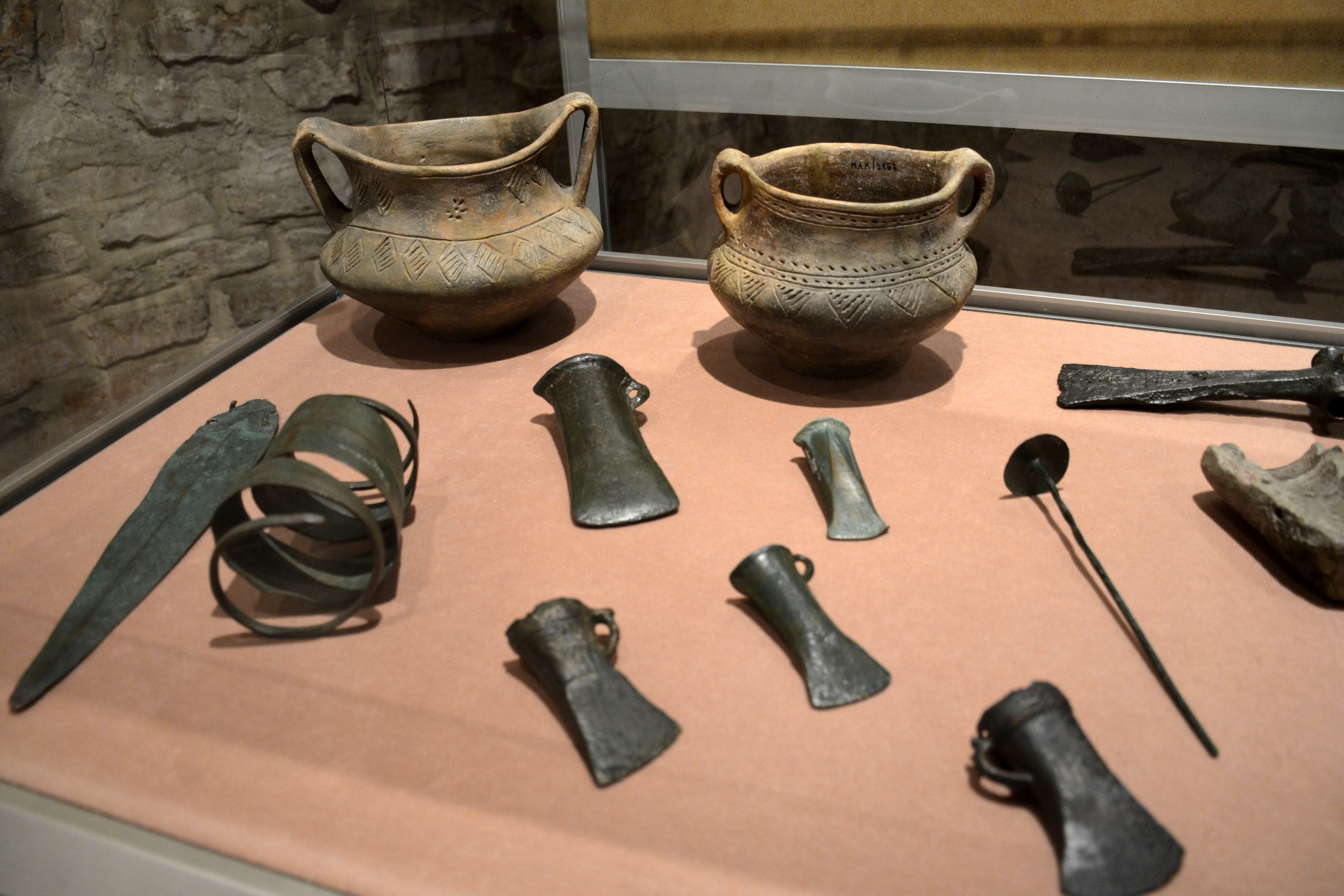
Pottery and bronze artefacts from the Komarov culture

== See also ==
- Nordic Bronze Age
- Srubnaya culture
- Andronovo culture
- Prelusatian culture

== Bibliography ==
- Juras, Anna; et al. (April 15, 2020). "Mitochondrial genomes from Bronze Age Poland reveal genetic continuity from the Late Neolithic and additional genetic affinities with the steppe populations". American Journal of Physical Anthropology. 172 (2). American Association of Physical Anthropologists: 176–188. doi:10.1002/ajpa.24057. PMID 32297323. S2CID 215793231.
- Mittnik, Alisa; et al. (January 30, 2018). "The genetic prehistory of the Baltic Sea region". Nature Communications. 16 (1). Nature Research: 442. Bibcode:2018NatCo...9..442M. doi:10.1038/s41467-018-02825-9. PMC 5789860. PMID 29382937.
- Prahistoria Ziem Polskich, tom IV pod redakcją W. Hensla Wydawnictwo PAN, Ossolineum, Wrocław, Warszawa, Kraków, Gdańsk, 1979.
- Pradzieje ziem polskich, tom I cz. 2 Epoka Brązu i początki Epoki Żelaza pod redakcją Kmiecińskiego, wyd. PWN Warszawa-Łodź 1989
- Wielka Historia Polski, tom I Najdawniejsze dzieje ziem polskich (do VII w.), Piotr Kaczanowski, Janusz K. Kozłowski, wyd. Fogra Kraków 1998
- Od neolityzacji do początków epoki brązu przemiany kulturowe w międzyrzeczu Odry i Dniepru VI i II tys. przed Chr. – praca zbiorowa pod redakcja Janusza Czebreszuka, Mikoly Kryvalceviča, Przemysława Makarowicza, Uniwersytet im. Adama Mickiewicza w Poznaniu. Instytut Prahistorii. Poznań : Wydaw. Poznańskie, 2001
- Encyklopedia historyczna świata tom I: Prehistoria, praca zbiorowe, opracowanie naukowe prof. Dr hab. Janusz K. Kozłowski, Agencja Publicystyczno-Wydawnicza Oppress, Kraków 1999
- Kultura pradziejowa na ziemiach Polski zarys, Jerzy Gąssowski, PWN, Warszawa 1985
