= Szarbia Zwierzyniecka =

- Village
- Location within Poland
- Coordinates: 50°19′51″N 20°22′21″E
- Country: Poland
- Voivodeship: Świętokrzyskie
- County: Kazimierza
- Gmina: Skalbmierz
- Population: 250

Szarbia Zwierzyniecka [ˈʂarbja zvjɛʐɨˈɲɛt͡ska] is a village in the administrative district of Gmina Skalbmierz, within Kazimierza County, Świętokrzyskie Voivodeship, in south-central Poland. It lies approximately 4 km (2 mi) west of Skalbmierz, 11 km (7 mi) north-west of Kazimierza Wielka, and 64 km (40 mi) south of the regional capital Kielce.
