= Szczekarzów =

- Village
- Location within Poland
- Coordinates: 50°17′23″N 20°25′27″E
- Country: Poland
- Voivodeship: Świętokrzyskie
- County: Kazimierza
- Gmina: Skalbmierz

Szczekarzów [ʂt͡ʂɛˈkaʐuf] is a village in the administrative district of Gmina Skalbmierz, within Kazimierza County, Świętokrzyskie Voivodeship, in south-central Poland.
