= Sietejów =

- Village
- Location within Poland
- Coordinates: 50°17′13″N 20°23′06″E
- Country: Poland
- Voivodeship: Świętokrzyskie
- County: Kazimierza
- Gmina: Skalbmierz

Sietejów [ɕɛˈtɛjuf] is a village in the administrative district of Gmina Skalbmierz, within Kazimierza County, Świętokrzyskie Voivodeship, in south-central Poland.
