= Komarov culture =

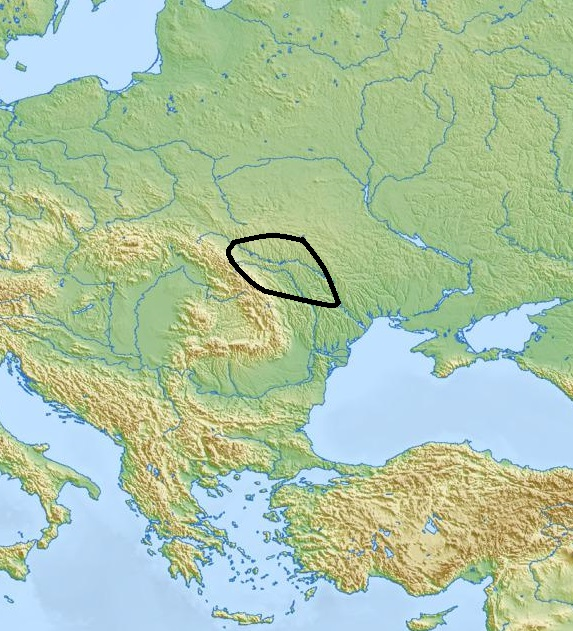
- Geographical range: Middle Dniester
- Period: Bronze Age
- Dates: ca. 1500–1200 BC
- Type site: Komarov
- Preceded by: Corded Ware culture
- Followed by: Chernoles culture

The Komarov culture was a Bronze Age culture which flourished along the middle Dniester from 1500 BC to 1200 BC.

Archaeologists have found few settlements from the Komarov culture. The culture is named after the Bronze Age burial, which was excavated in 1934 by Tadeusz Sulimirski near the modern-day village of Komariv (in the vicinity Halych, Ivano-Frankivsk Oblast, Ukraine). It contained twenty small single-roomed houses.

The Komarov culture is best known for its inhumation burials. These are set into stone- or timber-covered graves covered with a tumulus. Cremations and flat grave burials are also known. Decorations found on ceramics, and the presence of stone rings and cromlechs around the base of the tumuli, indicate that a sun cult existed among the Komarov people.

The Komarov culture is believed to have originated within the Corded Ware horizon, with which is shares numerous similarities, including burial rites, ceramics, and metallurgical traditions. It is closely related to the Trzciniec culture. Likewise it is patrilocal like the Trzciniec culture. Scholars often associate the Komarov culture with the early development of the Proto-Slavs or Thracians.

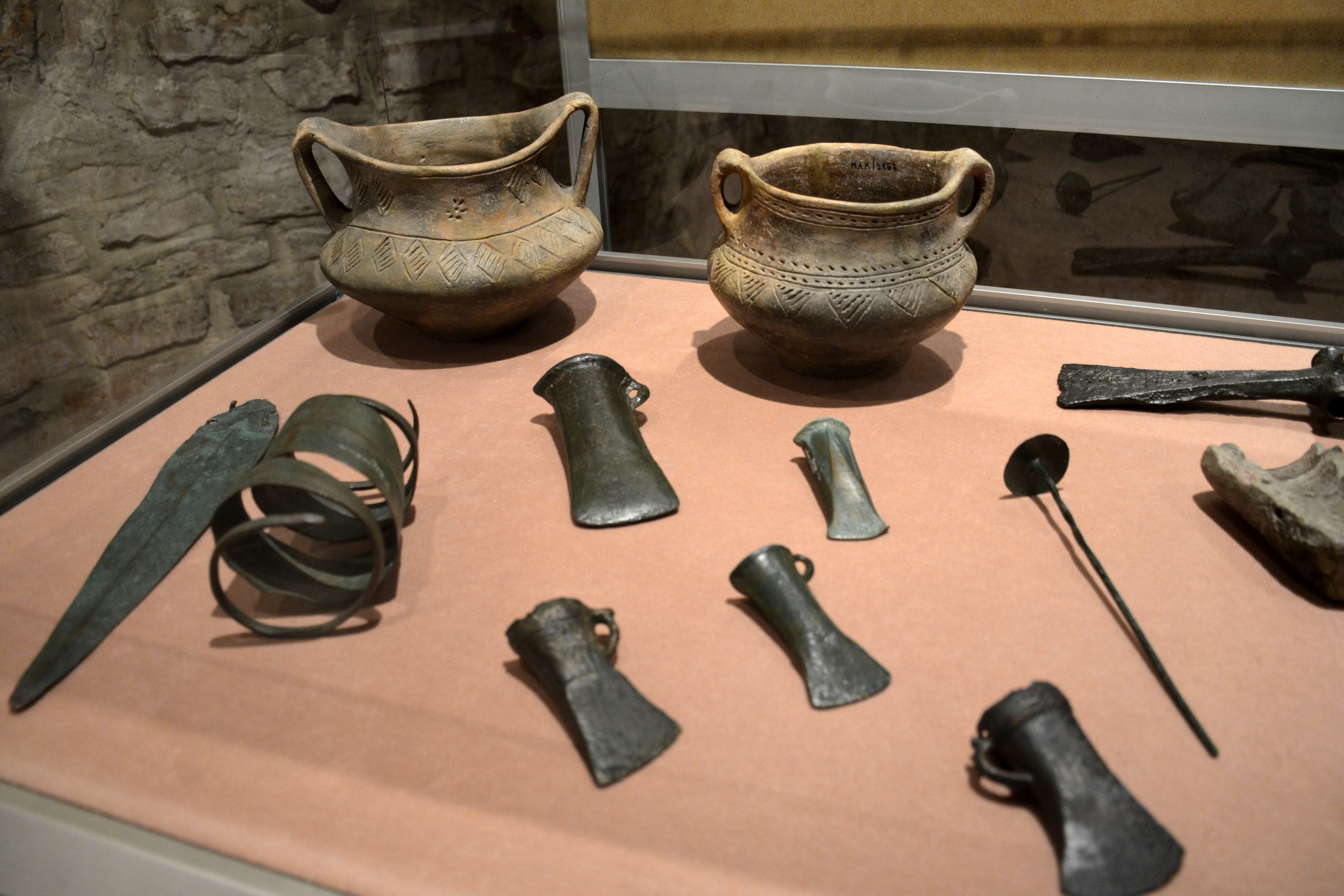
Bronze and ceramic artefacts of the Komarov culture

== See also ==
- Bronze Age Europe
- Vatin culture
- Nordic Bronze Age
- Tumulus culture
