= Petrykozy, Opoczno County =

Petrykozy
- Village
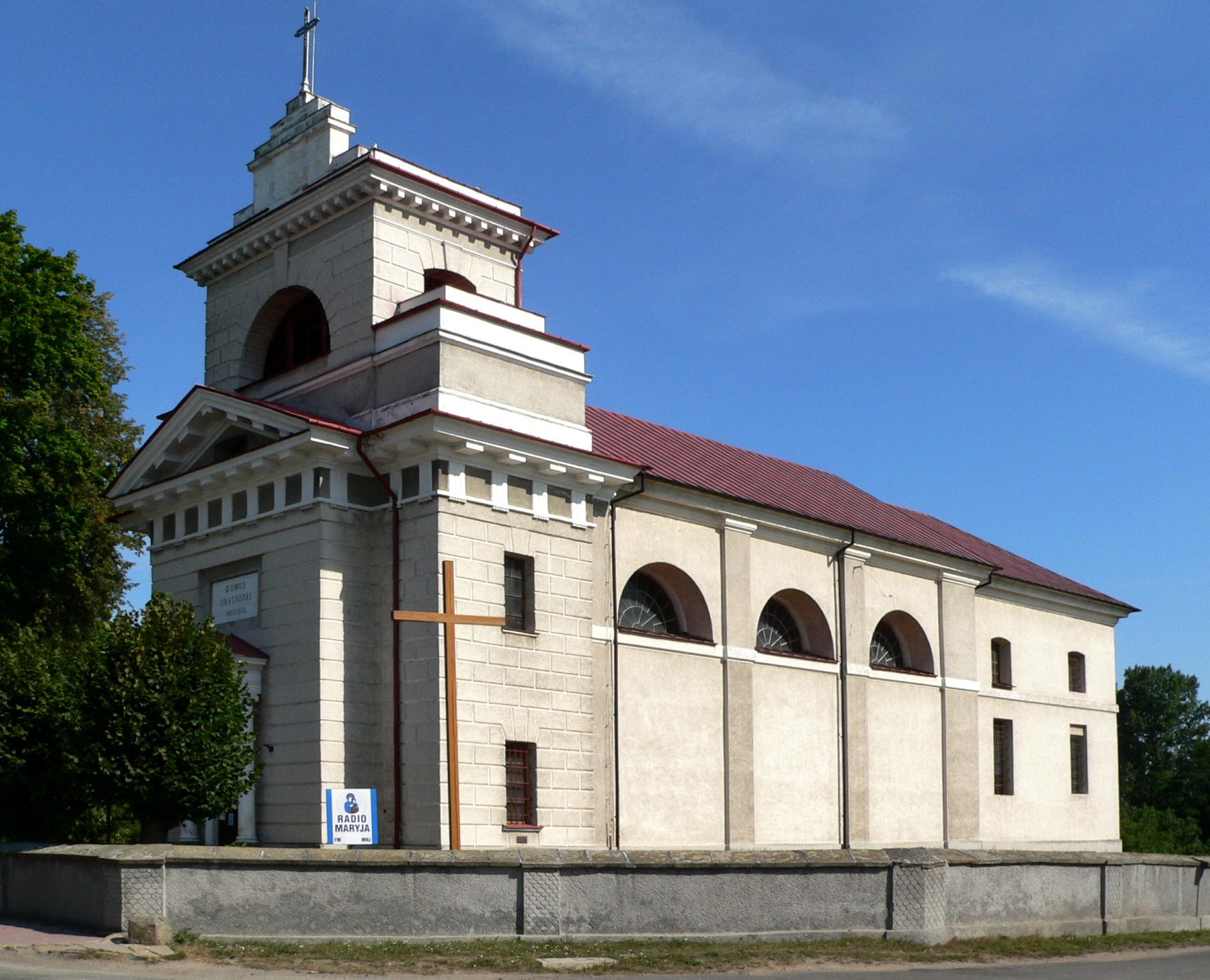
- Church of Saint Dorothea

- Location within Poland
- Coordinates: 51°17′30″N 20°16′50″E
- Country: Poland
- Voivodeship: Łódź
- County: Opoczno
- Gmina: Białaczów

Petrykozy [pɛtrɨˈkɔzɨ] is a village in the administrative district of Gmina Białaczów, within Opoczno County, Łódź Voivodeship, in central Poland.
