= Gmina Skalbmierz =

Gmina Skalbmierz Skalbmierz Commune
- Gmina
- Coat of arms
- Interactive map of Gmina Skalbmierz
- Coordinates (Skalbmierz): 50°20′N 20°25′E
- Country: Poland
- Voivodeship: Świętokrzyskie
- County: Kazimierza
- Seat: Skalbmierz

Area
  - Total: 86.21 km^{2} (33.29 sq mi)

Population (2006)
  - Total: 6,930
  - Density: 80.4/km^{2} (208/sq mi)
  - Urban: 1,323
  - Rural: 5,607
- Website: http://www.tai.com.pl/skalbmierz

Gmina Skalbmierz is an urban-rural gmina (administrative district) in Kazimierza County, Świętokrzyskie Voivodeship, in south-central Poland. Its seat is the town of Skalbmierz, which lies approximately 9 kilometres (6 mi) north-west of Kazimierza Wielka and 63 km (39 mi) south of the regional capital Kielce.

The gmina covers an area of 86.21 square kilometres (33.3 sq mi), and as of 2006 its total population is 6,930 (out of which the population of Skalbmierz amounts to 1,323, and the population of the rural part of the gmina is 5,607).

== Villages ==
Apart from the town of Skalbmierz, Gmina Skalbmierz contains the villages and settlements of Baranów, Bełzów, Bolowiec, Boszczynek, Drożejowice, Grodzonowice, Kobylniki, Kózki, Krępice, Małoszów, Podgaje, Przybenice, Rosiejów, Sielec Biskupi, Sielec-Kolonia, Sietejów, Szarbia Zwierzyniecka, Szczekarzów, Tempoczów-Kolonia, Tempoczów-Rędziny, Topola, Zakrzów and Zakrzówek.

== Neighbouring gminas ==
Gmina Skalbmierz is bordered by the gminas of Czarnocin, Działoszyce, Kazimierza Wielka, Pałecznica and Racławice.
