= Krępice, Świętokrzyskie Voivodeship =

Krępice
- Village
- Location within Poland
- Coordinates: 50°20′3″N 20°27′25″E
- Country: Poland
- Voivodeship: Świętokrzyskie
- County: Kazimierza
- Gmina: Skalbmierz

Krępice [krɛmˈpit͡sɛ] is a village in the administrative district of Gmina Skalbmierz, within Kazimierza County, Świętokrzyskie Voivodeship, in south-central Poland. It lies approximately 3 km (2 mi) east of Skalbmierz, 7 km (4 mi) north of Kazimierza Wielka, and 62 km (39 mi) south of the regional capital Kielce.
