= Chernoles culture =

Iron Age archaeological culture in Eastern Europe

- Geographical range: Ukraine
- Period: Iron Age
- Dates: c. 1025 BC – c. 700 BC
- Preceded by: Belogrudov culture Komarov culture
- Followed by: Chernyakhov culture

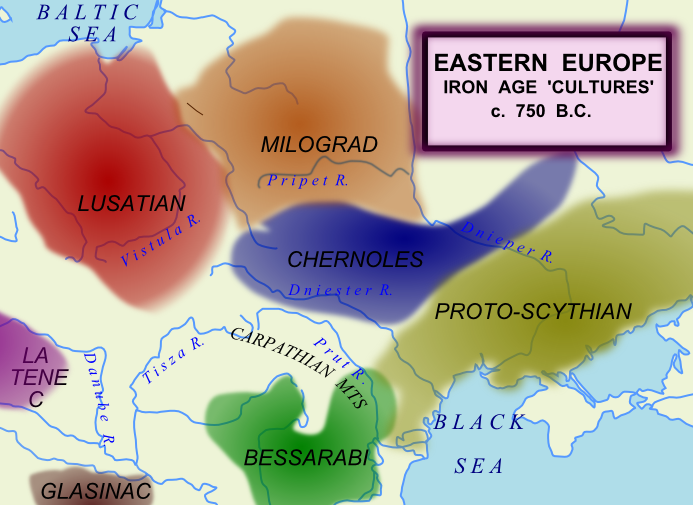
Archaeological Cultures, eastern Europe, c. mid 8th century BC

Chernoles culture or Black Forest culture (Ukrainian: Чорноліська культура) is an Iron Age archaeological unit dating c. 1025–700 BC. It was located in the forest-steppe between the Dniester and Dnieper Rivers, in the Black Forest (Чорний ліс) of Kirovohrad Oblast in central Ukraine. This location corresponds to where Herodotus later placed his Scythian ploughmen. From 200 BC, the culture was overrun by the arrival of Germanic and Celtic settlers to the region.

Chernolesian settlements include open sites and also fortified sites surrounded by multiple banks and ditches. Houses were usually surface-dwellings and of substantial size, about 10 x 6 m. Artifacts found in settlements include stone and bronze axes, weapons, bronze ornaments, and iron tools. Cultivated wheat, barley, and millet were staples. The economy was agricultural, with stockbreeding. Bronze artefacts indicate significant contact with Scythian nomads, and finds of finer ceramic wares suggest contact with Thrace and Black Sea Greek colonies. Inhabitants practised biritual burials: inhumation under barrows and cremation in urnfields (the latter predominated in later periods).

Classical Chernoles period finished c. 500 BC, corresponding to a simplification in the material culture, interpreted to represent a pauperization due to the political domination of the forest-steppe communities by Scythians. In these latter stages, we see an increase in fortified settlements, perhaps representing a defensive measure against the nomads (with earthen ramparts, ditches and timber walls). Despite the difficulties, settlement density actually increases, and the socio-cultural traditions continued.
