= Sobień, Opoczno County =

Sobień
- Village
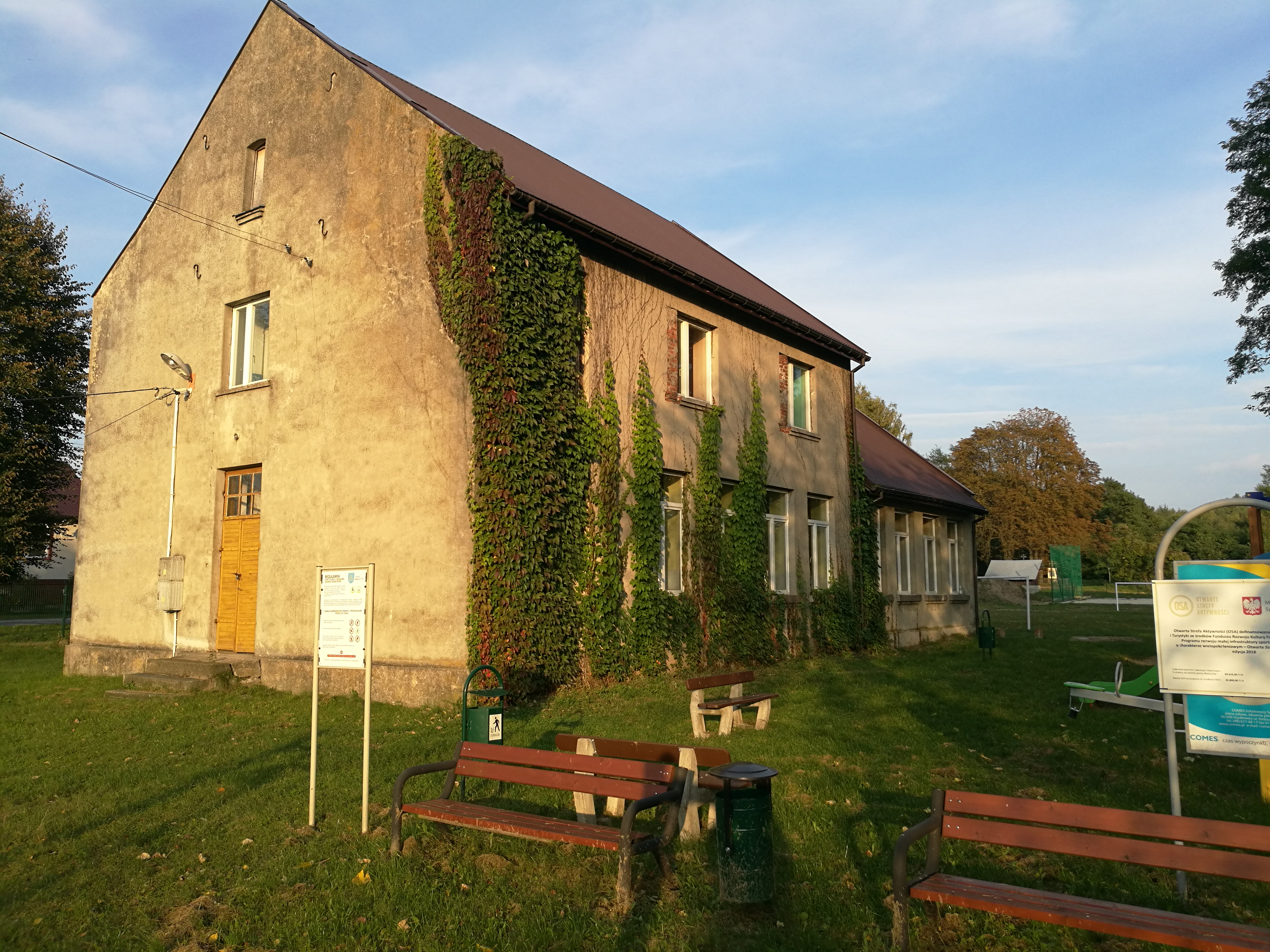

- Location within Poland
- Coordinates: 51°16′N 20°18′E
- Country: Poland
- Voivodeship: Łódź
- County: Opoczno
- Gmina: Białaczów

Sobień [ˈsɔbjɛɲ] is a village in the administrative district of Gmina Białaczów, within Opoczno County, Łódź Voivodeship, in central Poland.
