= Zakrzów, Kazimierza County =

Zakrzów
- Village
- Location within Poland
- Coordinates: 50°17′51″N 20°23′34″E
- Country: Poland
- Voivodeship: Świętokrzyskie
- County: Kazimierza
- Gmina: Skalbmierz

Zakrzów [ˈzakʂuf] is a village in the administrative district of Gmina Skalbmierz, within Kazimierza County, Świętokrzyskie Voivodeship, in south-central Poland. It lies approximately 5 km (3 mi) south-west of Skalbmierz, 8 km (5 mi) west of Kazimierza Wielka, and 67 km (42 mi) south of the regional capital Kielce.
