= Gmina Białaczów =

Gmina Białaczów Białaczów Commune
- Gmina
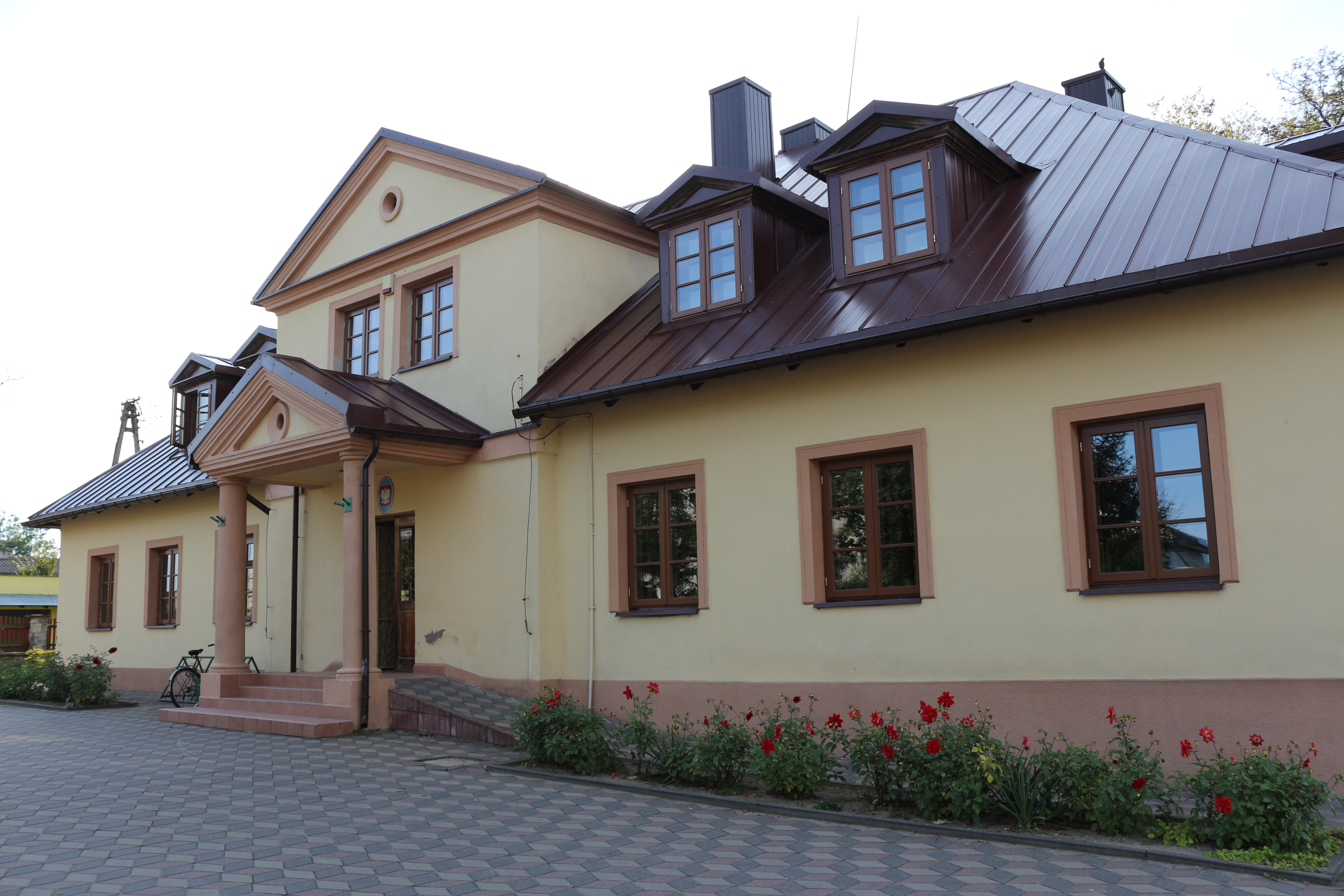
- Gmina office in Białaczów

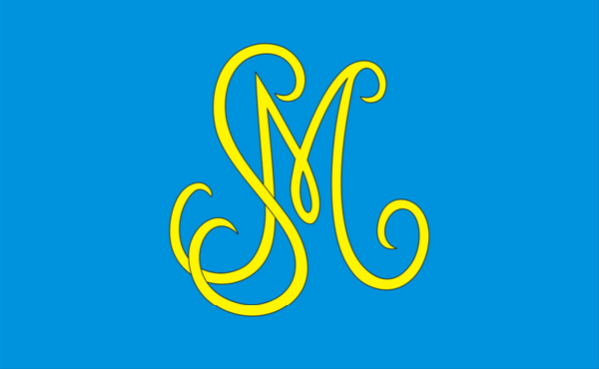
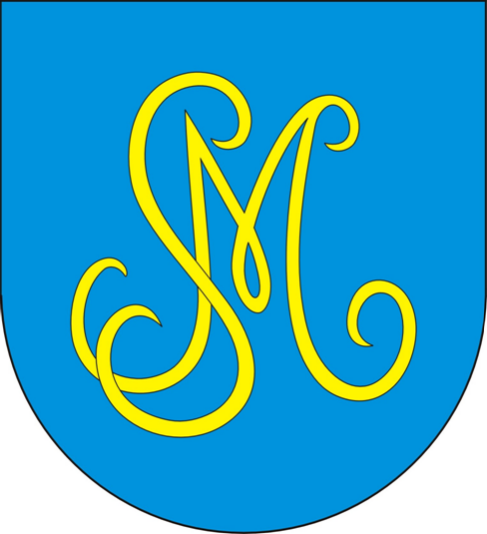
- Flag Coat of arms
- Interactive map of Gmina Białaczów
- Coordinates (Białaczów): 51°18′N 20°18′E
- Country: Poland
- Voivodeship: Łódź
- County: Opoczno
- Seat: Białaczów

Area
  - Total: 114.49 km^{2} (44.20 sq mi)

Population (2006)
  - Total: 5,980
  - Density: 52.2/km^{2} (135/sq mi)
- Time zone: UTC+1 (CET)
  - Summer (DST): UTC+2 (CEST)
- Vehicle registration: EOP
- Website: www.bialaczow.pl

Gmina Białaczów is an urban-rural gmina (administrative district) in Opoczno County, Łódź Voivodeship, in central Poland. Its seat is the town of Białaczów, which lies approximately 10 kilometres (6 mi) south of Opoczno and 79 km (49 mi) south-east of the regional capital Łódź.

The gmina covers an area of 114.49 square kilometres (44.2 sq mi), and as of 2006 its total population is 5,980.

== Villages ==
Gmina Białaczów contains the town of Białaczów and villages and settlements of:

- Kuraszków
- Miedzna Drewniana
- Ossa
- Parczów
- Parczówek
- Petrykozy
- Radwan
- Sędów
- Skronina
- Sobień
- Wąglany
- Zakrzów
- Żelazowice

== Neighbouring gminas ==
Gmina Białaczów is bordered by the gminas of Gowarczów, Końskie, Opoczno, Paradyż, Sławno and Żarnów.
