= Radwan, Łódź Voivodeship =

Radwan
- Village
- Location within Poland
- Coordinates: 51°18′N 20°12′E
- Country: Poland
- Voivodeship: Łódź
- County: Opoczno
- Gmina: Białaczów
- Population: 246

Radwan [ˈradvan] is a village in the administrative district of Gmina Białaczów, within Opoczno County, Łódź Voivodeship, in central Poland.
