= Żelazowice =

- Village
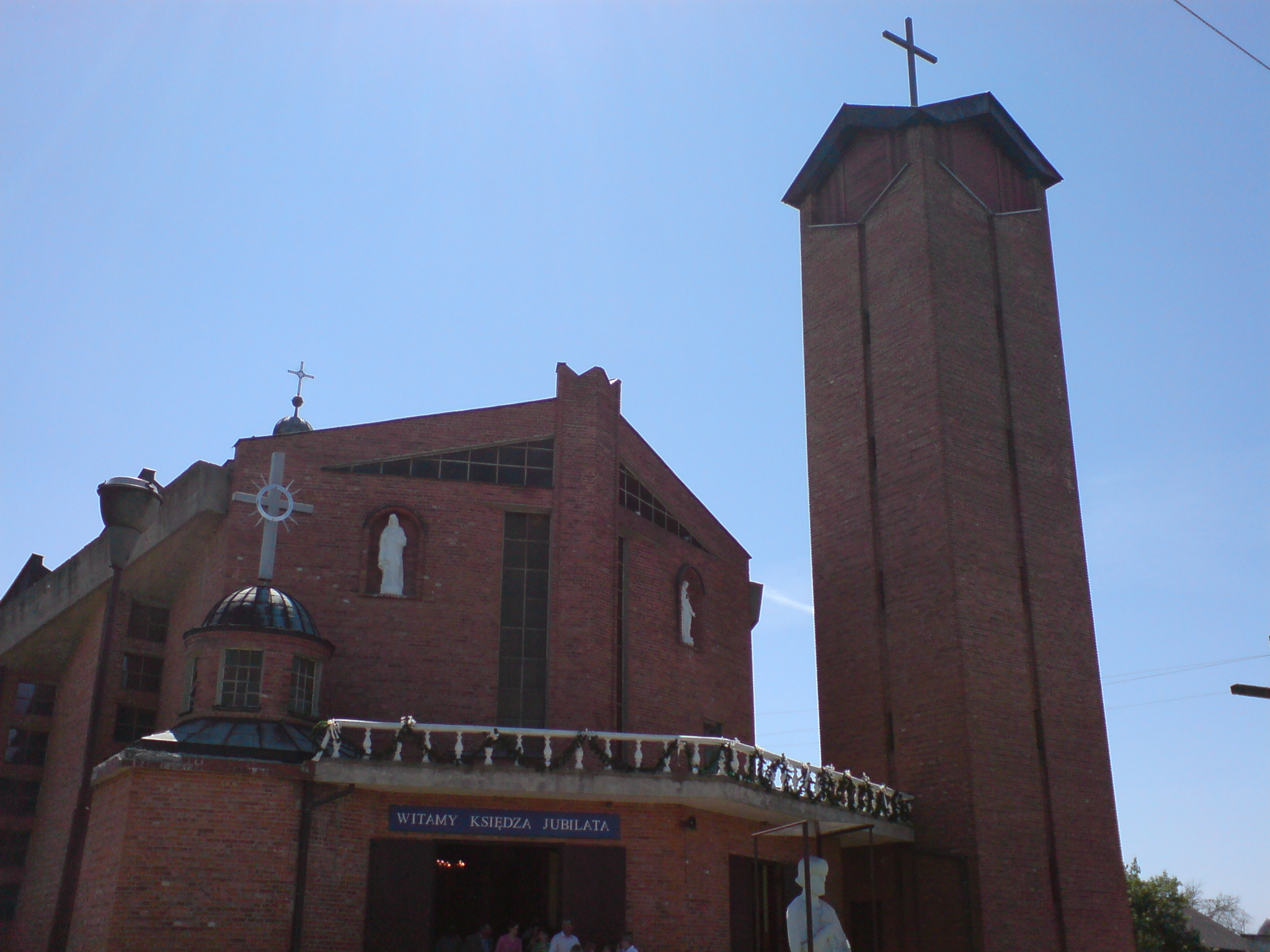

- Location within Poland
- Coordinates: 51°19′N 20°14′E
- Country: Poland
- Voivodeship: Łódź
- County: Opoczno
- Gmina: Białaczów

Żelazowice [ʐɛlazɔˈvit͡sɛ] is a village in the administrative district of Gmina Białaczów, within Opoczno County, Łódź Voivodeship, in central Poland.
