= Skronina =

- Village
- Location within Poland
- Coordinates: 51°17′N 20°23′E
- Country: Poland
- Voivodeship: Łódź
- County: Opoczno
- Gmina: Białaczów

Skronina [skrɔˈnina] is a village in the administrative district of Gmina Białaczów, within Opoczno County, Łódź Voivodeship, in central Poland.
