= Białaczów =

- Town
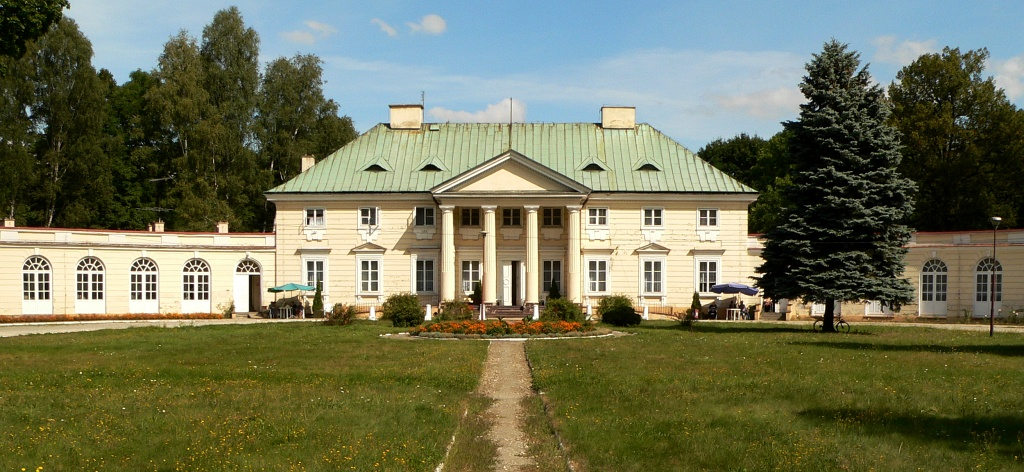
- Małachowski Palace

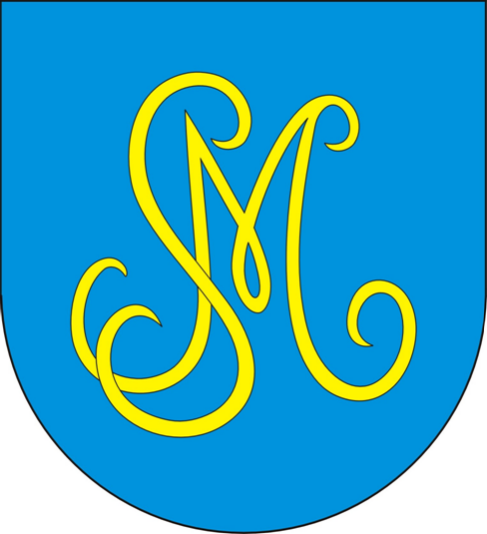
- Coat of arms

- Location within Poland
- Coordinates: 51°18′N 20°18′E
- Country: Poland
- Voivodeship: Łódź
- County: Opoczno
- Gmina: Białaczów

Population
  - Total: 1,500
- Time zone: UTC+1 (CET)
  - Summer (DST): UTC+2 (CEST)
- Postal code: 26-307
- Vehicle registration: EOP

Białaczów [bjaˈwat͡ʂuf] is a town in Opoczno County, Łódź Voivodeship, in central Poland. It is the seat of the gmina (administrative district) called Gmina Białaczów. It lies approximately 10 km (6 mi) south of Opoczno and 79 km (49 mi) south-east of the regional capital Łódź. Historically, Białaczów belongs to Lesser Poland.

== History ==
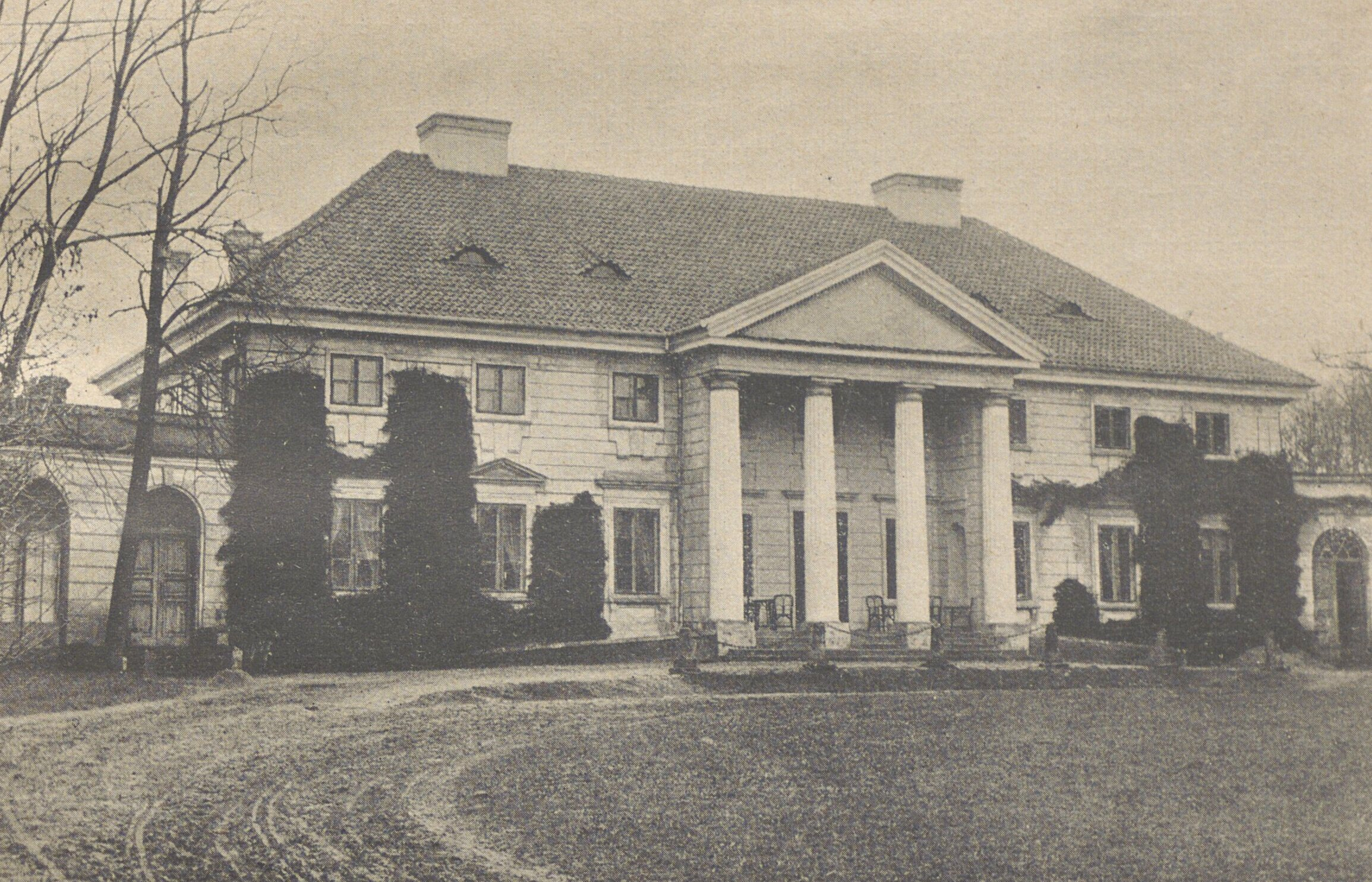
Małachowski Palace in the 1920s

In the 13th century, Białaczów belonged to the Odrowąż family. The village received its town charter in 1456. Within the Kingdom of Poland, it was part of Opoczno County of Sandomierz Voivodeship of the Lesser Poland Province. Białaczów was a private town, changing hands several times. In the late 18th and early 19th century it belonged to Stanisław Małachowski, who in neighboring villages opened several early industry factories. Its coat of arms was devised by Stanisław Małachowski in 1787.

In 1795 Białaczów found itself in the Austrian Empire following the Third Partition of Poland. After the Polish victory in the Austro-Polish War of 1809, it was regained by Poles and included within the short-lived Duchy of Warsaw. After the duchy's dissolution in 1815, it became part of the Russian-controlled Congress Kingdom. In 1870, like many other towns of northern Lesser Poland, Białaczów was reduced to the status of a village, as a punishment for residents’ patriotic support of the anti-Russian January Uprising.

In the interwar period, it was administratively located in the Opoczno County in the Kielce Voivodeship of Poland. According to the 1921 census, Białaczów with the adjacent railway settlement and manor farm had a population of 1,671, 95.5% Polish and 4.5% Jewish.

Following the joint German-Soviet invasion of Poland, which started World War II in September 1939, the town was occupied by Germany until 1945.

== Points of interest ==
- parish church. First church in Białaczów was built in the 13th century. It burned in 1511, and was rebuilt soon afterwards. The church was remodeled in 1694–1696, 1870 and 1932,
- classicistic town hall (1797),
- classicistic palace complex with a park, built in 1797-1800 by Stanisław Małachowski, renovated in the 1980s,
- early 19th century inn,
- 18th and 19th century houses in the market square.

== Notable people ==
- Jan Prandota (c. 1200–1266), Bishop of Kraków, born in Białaczów
