= Sędów, Opoczno County =

Sędów
- Village
- Location within Poland
- Coordinates: 51°15′38″N 20°21′46″E
- Country: Poland
- Voivodeship: Łódź
- County: Opoczno
- Gmina: Białaczów

Sędów [ˈsɛnduf] is a village in the administrative district of Gmina Białaczów, within Opoczno County, Łódź Voivodeship, in central Poland.
