= Skalbmierz =

Town in south eastern Poland

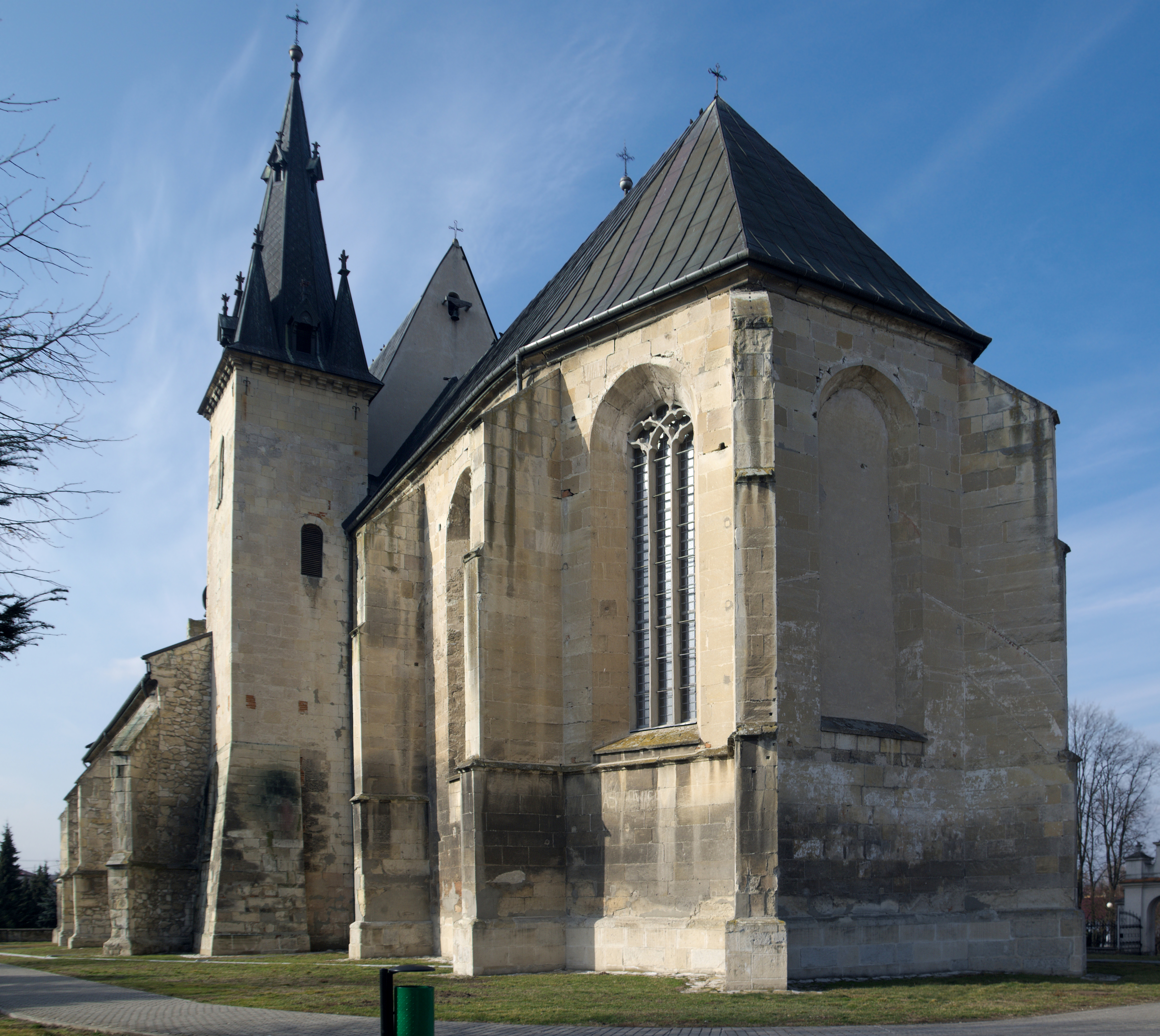
- Romanesque-Gothic church in Skalbmierz

- Coat of arms

- Location within Poland
- Coordinates: 50°20′N 20°25′E
- Country: Poland
- Voivodeship: Świętokrzyskie
- County: Kazimierza
- Gmina: Skalbmierz
- Established: first half of 12th century
- Earliest record: 1217
- Town rights: 20 February 1342

Government
  - Mayor: Marek Juszczyk (PiS)

Area
  - Total: 7.13 km^{2} (2.75 sq mi)
- Elevation: 200 m (660 ft)

Population (2012)
  - Total: 1,310
  - Density: 184/km^{2} (476/sq mi)
- Time zone: UTC+1 (CET)
  - Summer (DST): UTC+2 (CEST)
- Postal code: 28–530
- Area code: +48 41
- Car plates: TKA
- Website: Skalbmierz

Skalbmierz [ˈskalbmʲɛʂ] is a town in southern Poland, in Świętokrzyskie Voivodeship, in Kazimierza County. It has 1,326 inhabitants (2004). Skalbmierz has a long and rich history, the town belongs to the historic region of Lesser Poland.

== History ==
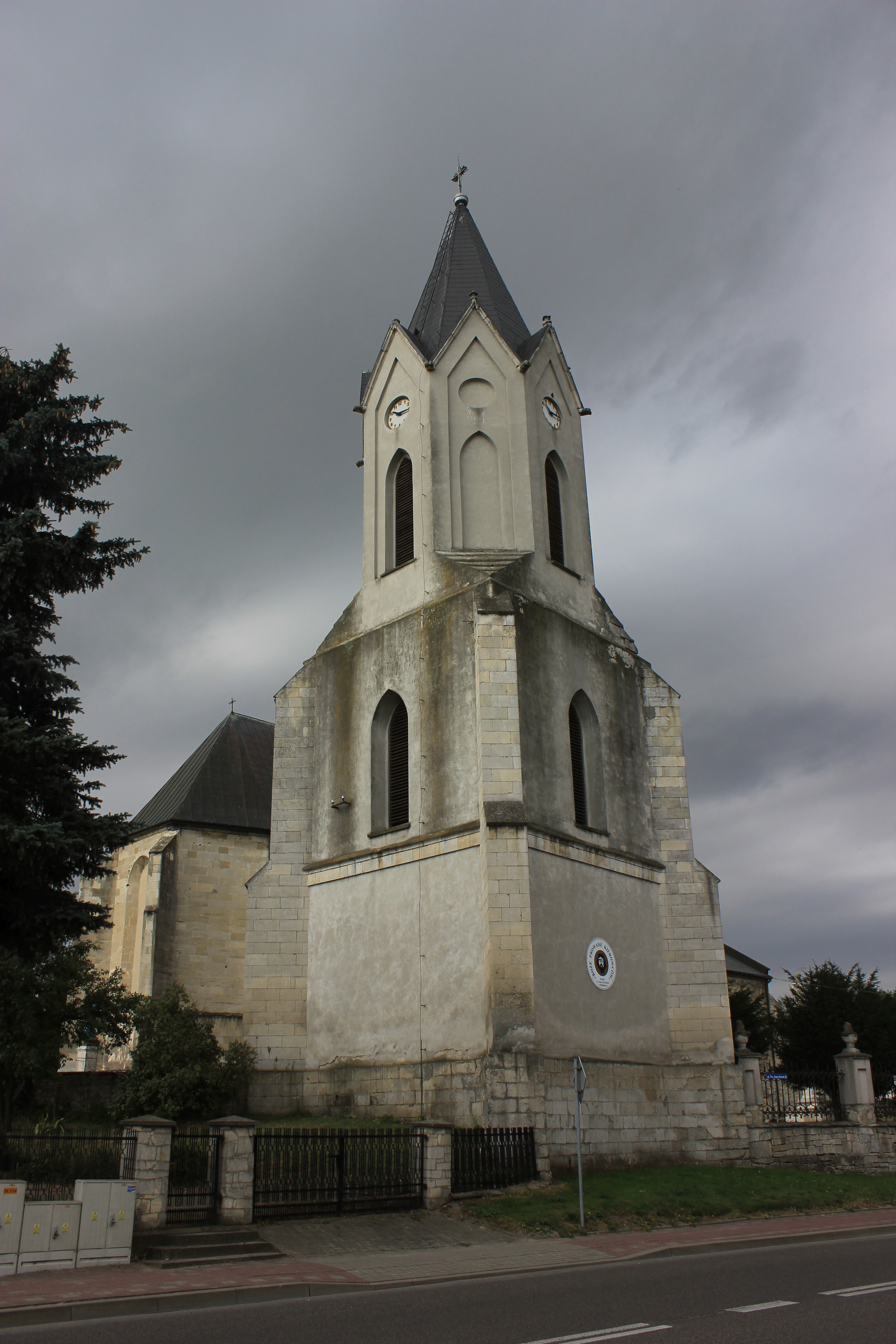
Old bell tower

Skalbmierz was presumably founded in the first half of the 12th century, yet it was first mentioned in written sources in 1217. It was devastated during the first Mongol invasion of Poland in 1241. In 1242, Konrad I of Masovia called a meeting in Skalbmierz, where he imprisoned representatives of Lesser Poland. In 1309, a school in Skalbmierz was first mentioned. On 20 February 1342, was granted a town charter (see Magdeburg rights) by King Casimir III the Great. In 1400, Stanisław of Skarbimierz became first vice-chancellor of Kraków Academy. Skalbmierz's town charter was confirmed by King Władysław II Jagiełło in 1427 and Bishop of Kraków Jan Rzeszowski on 24 May 1483. In 1578 King Stephen Bathory confirmed the right of Kraków curates to appoint Skalbmierz president canons of the Chapter. The town was hit by a fire in 1618 and plague epidemic in 1652–1653. In 1655–1657, it was destroyed by the invading Swedes, Hungarians and Cossacks (see Deluge (history)). To help revive the town, King John II Casimir Vasa confirmed old privileges and established four annual fairs in 1666. On 25 September 1781, King Stanisław August Poniatowski confirmed the privileges of Skalbmierz. On 29 April 1794, Russian general Fiodor Denisov during the retreat from Racławice robbed Skalbmierz and set it on fire.

In 1795, following the Third Partition of Poland, the town was annexed by Austria. After the Polish victory in the Austro-Polish War of 1809, it became part of the short-lived Duchy of Warsaw, and after the duchy's dissolution in 1815, the town became part of Russian-controlled Congress Poland. In 1807 and 1808, the town was hit by a fire. On 17 April 1810, Skalbmierz became capital of Skalbmierz County. In 1819, the collegiate church was turned into a regular parish church. During the November Uprising, on 24 October 1831, a skirmirsh between Polish insurgents and Russian troops took place near Drożejowice. In 1869, Russian administration revoked the town rights of Skalbmierz as punishment for the unsuccessful Polish January Uprising. In 1884, Maria Skłodowska stayed in Skalbmierz. In 1906, there was a fire of the local church. In 1912, a fire brigade was established.

1918 witnessed the rise of Polish Military Organization (Polska Organizacja Wojskowa) and a scout troop. Since 1919, a railway station was built in Skalbmierz (station on the route between Charsznica and Kocmyrzów). In the 1921 census, 85.1% of the population declared Polish nationality and 14.8% declared Jewish nationality. On 31 March 1927, town rights were restored thanks to Antoni Baum's initiative. In 1927, Stefczyk's cash office opened, prototype of today's Co-operative Bank (Bank Spółdzielczy, see Cooperative banking). In 1931 the Committee of Military Preparation and Physical Education was established in Skalbmierz. In 1933, a shooting association was established. In 1933–1934, a new building of the common school was erected.

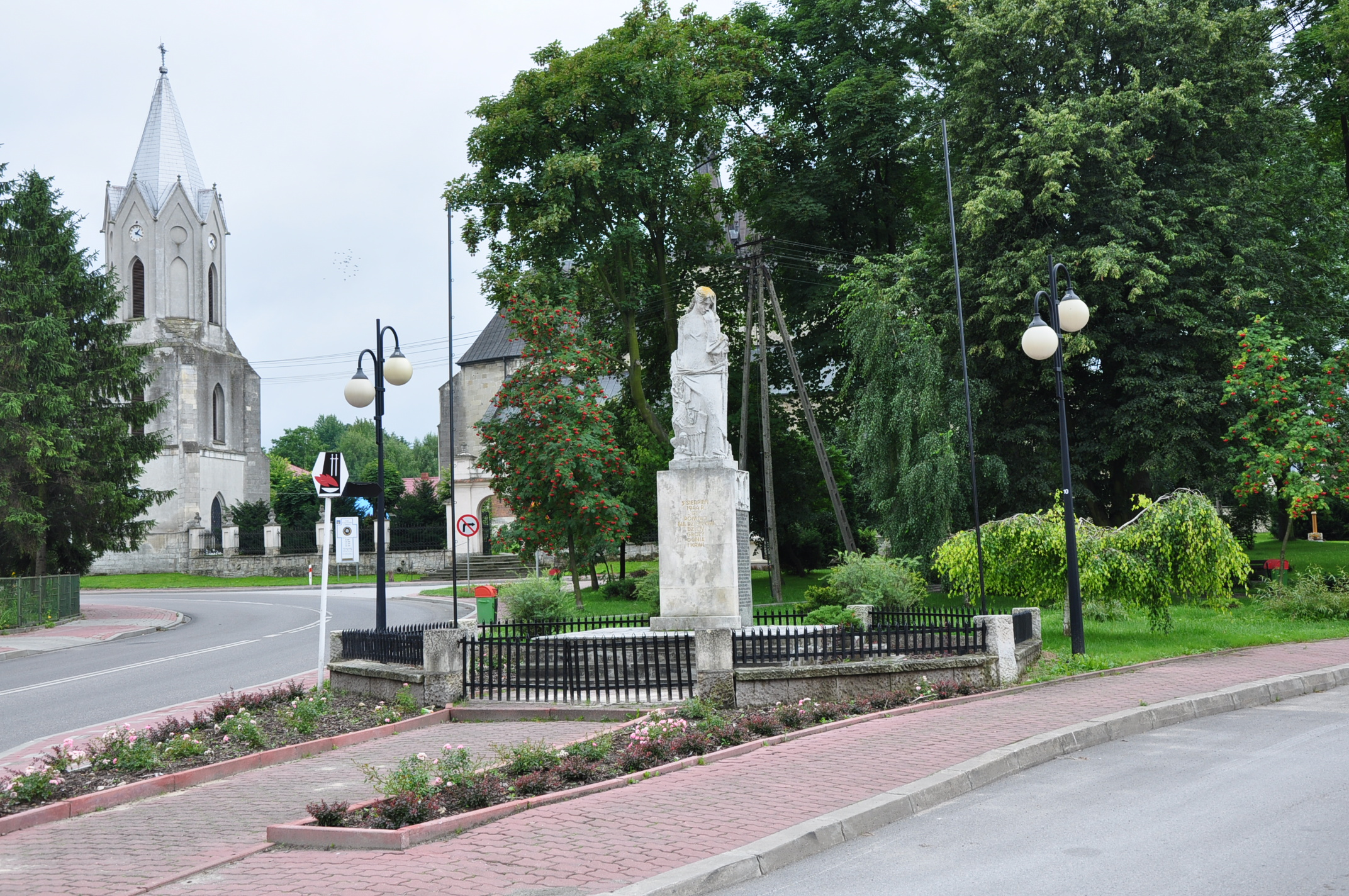
Memorial to the victims of the German pacification of Skalbmierz

During the German invasion of Poland at the start of World War II, it was the place of fights on 6–7 September 1939. Afterwards, the town was occupied by Germany. On 14 November 1939, the region of Skalbmierz and Działoszyce joined and turned into a place of underground Polish resistance. The German administration operated a forced labour camp for Jews in the town. On 5 August 1944, the town was pacified by the German occupiers. On 14 January 1945, the Red Army entered Skalbmierz and German occupation ended with the town soon restored to Poland.

On 1 August 1948, the Communal cooperative "SCh" was established. In 1952, the electrification of Skalbmierz was completed. In 1956, Skalbmierz became part of Kazimierza County. In 1959, thanks to Emilian Jaros's initiative a vocational school opened (later renamed as the Vocational Schools Complex). On 3 September 1969, Skalbmierz was decorated with the Cross of Grunwald (3rd class). On 1 October 1984, a new primary school building was opened.

In 2005, the Skalbmierz water reservoir was built.

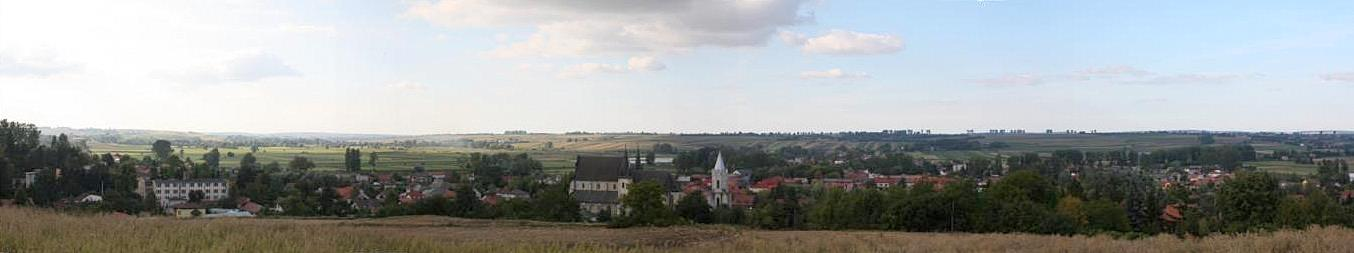
A panoramic view of Skalbmierz.

== Demographics ==
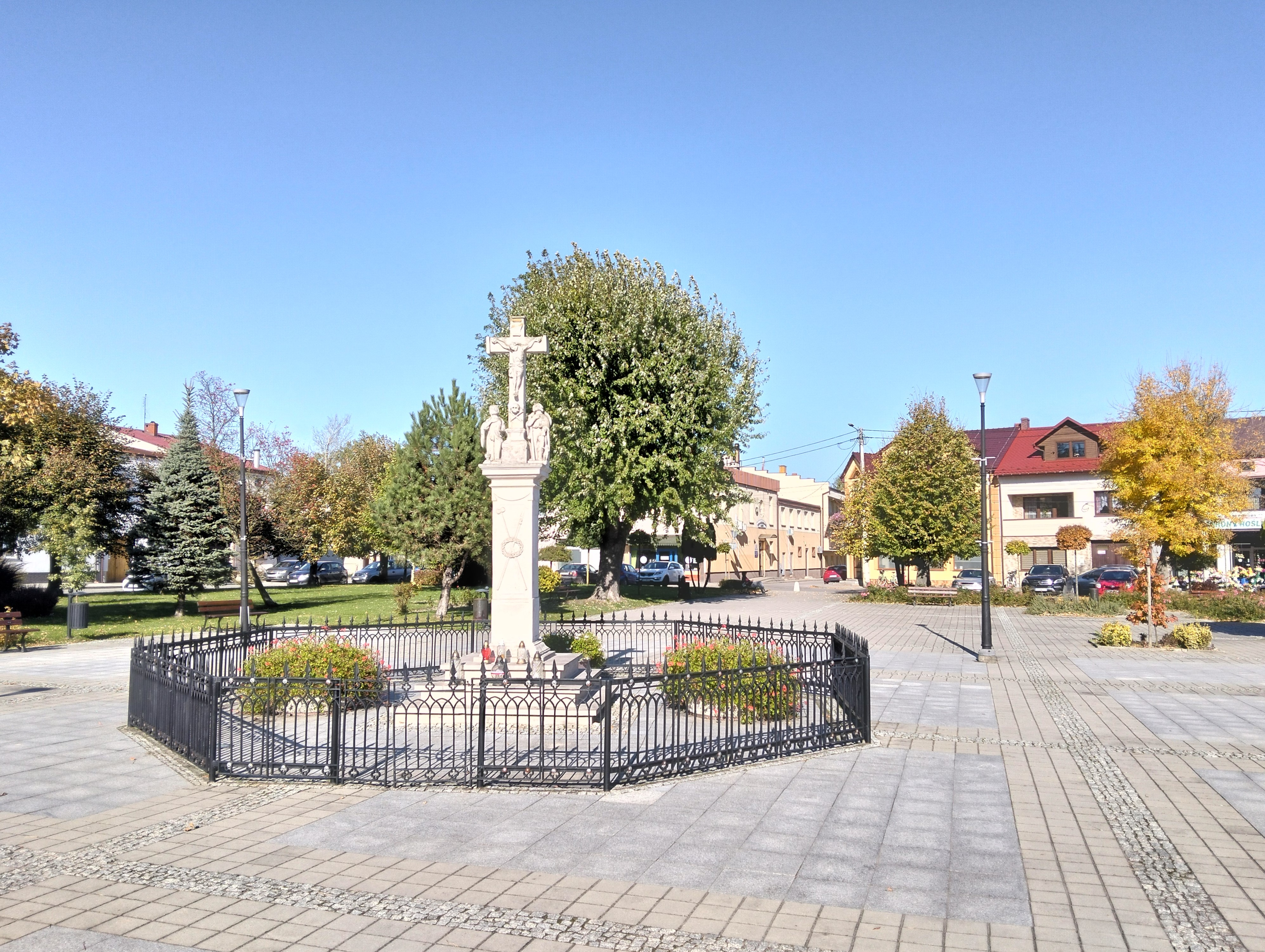
Marie Skłodowska-Curie Square

Historical population

Year	Pop.	±%
1910	1,605	—
1921	1,715	+6.9%
1931	2,245	+30.9%

Year	Pop.	±%
1939	2,365	+5.3%
1950	1,522	−35.6%
1960	1,625	+6.8%

== Transport ==
Skalbmierz lies on the intersection of voivodeship roads 783 and 768.

The nearest railway station is in Słomniki.

== See also ==
- The Lesser Polish Way
