= Strich =

Strich may refer to:

- Fritz Strich (1882–1963), Swiss-German literature historian
- Horst-Dieter Strich (born 1941), German footballer
- William Strich, founder of American piano manufacturer Strich & Zeidler
- Die Strich, an 1828 monograph by Franz Körte
- The screech owl

== See also ==
- Stritch (disambiguation)
- Strych (disambiguation)
