= Strych =

Strych may refer to:

- Strych, Masovian Voivodeship, east-central Poland
- Strych, Pomeranian Voivodeship, northern Poland
- Strych, a Bohemian unit of area
- "Strych" ("The Attic"), a 1930 short story by Stefan Grabiński
- "Strych", a 2008 song by Bezimienni featuring Kasia Moś

== See also ==
- Stritch (disambiguation)
