= Królewice =

Królewice may refer to the following places:

- Królewice, Kazimierza County in Świętokrzyskie Voivodeship (south-central Poland)
- Królewice, Sandomierz County in Świętokrzyskie Voivodeship (south-central Poland)
- Królewice, West Pomeranian Voivodeship (north-west Poland)
