= Otoka, Poland =

Otoka
- Village
- Location within Poland
- Coordinates: 50°31′2″N 21°30′55″E
- Country: Poland
- Voivodeship: Świętokrzyskie
- County: Sandomierz
- Gmina: Łoniów
- Population: 260

Otoka [ɔˈtɔka] is a village in the administrative district of Gmina Łoniów, within Sandomierz County, Świętokrzyskie Voivodeship, in south-central Poland. It lies approximately 6 km (4 mi) south of Łoniów, 25 km (16 mi) south-west of Sandomierz, and 76 km (47 mi) south-east of the regional capital Kielce.
