= Piaseczno, Świętokrzyskie Voivodeship =

Piaseczno
- Village
- Location within Poland
- Coordinates: 50°33′N 21°35′E
- Country: Poland
- Voivodeship: Świętokrzyskie
- County: Sandomierz
- Gmina: Łoniów

Piaseczno [pjaˈsɛt͡ʂnɔ] is a village in the administrative district of Gmina Łoniów, within Sandomierz County, Świętokrzyskie Voivodeship, in south-central Poland. It lies approximately 5 km (3 mi) east of Łoniów, 19 km (12 mi) south-west of Sandomierz, and 78 km (48 mi) south-east of the regional capital Kielce.
