= Bogoria, Sandomierz County =

Bogoria
- Village
- Location within Poland
- Coordinates: 50°32′N 21°34′E
- Country: Poland
- Voivodeship: Świętokrzyskie
- County: Sandomierz
- Gmina: Łoniów

Bogoria [bɔˈɡɔrja] is a village in the administrative district of Gmina Łoniów, within Sandomierz County, Świętokrzyskie Voivodeship, in south-central Poland. It lies approximately 5 km (3 mi) south-east of Łoniów, 22 km (14 mi) south-west of Sandomierz, and 78 km (48 mi) south-east of the regional capital Kielce.
