= Kępa Nagnajewska =

- Village
- Location within Poland
- Coordinates: 50°32′0″N 21°37′0″E
- Country: Poland
- Voivodeship: Świętokrzyskie
- County: Sandomierz
- Gmina: Łoniów
- Population: 84

Kępa Nagnajewska [ˈkɛmpa naɡnaˈjɛfska] is a village in the administrative district of Gmina Łoniów, within Sandomierz County, Świętokrzyskie Voivodeship, in south-central Poland. It lies approximately 8 km (5 mi) south-east of Łoniów, 20 km (12 mi) south-west of Sandomierz, and 81 km (50 mi) south-east of the regional capital Kielce.
