= Młyńsk, Pomeranian Voivodeship =

Village in Pomeranian Voivodeship, Poland

Młyńsk
- Settlement
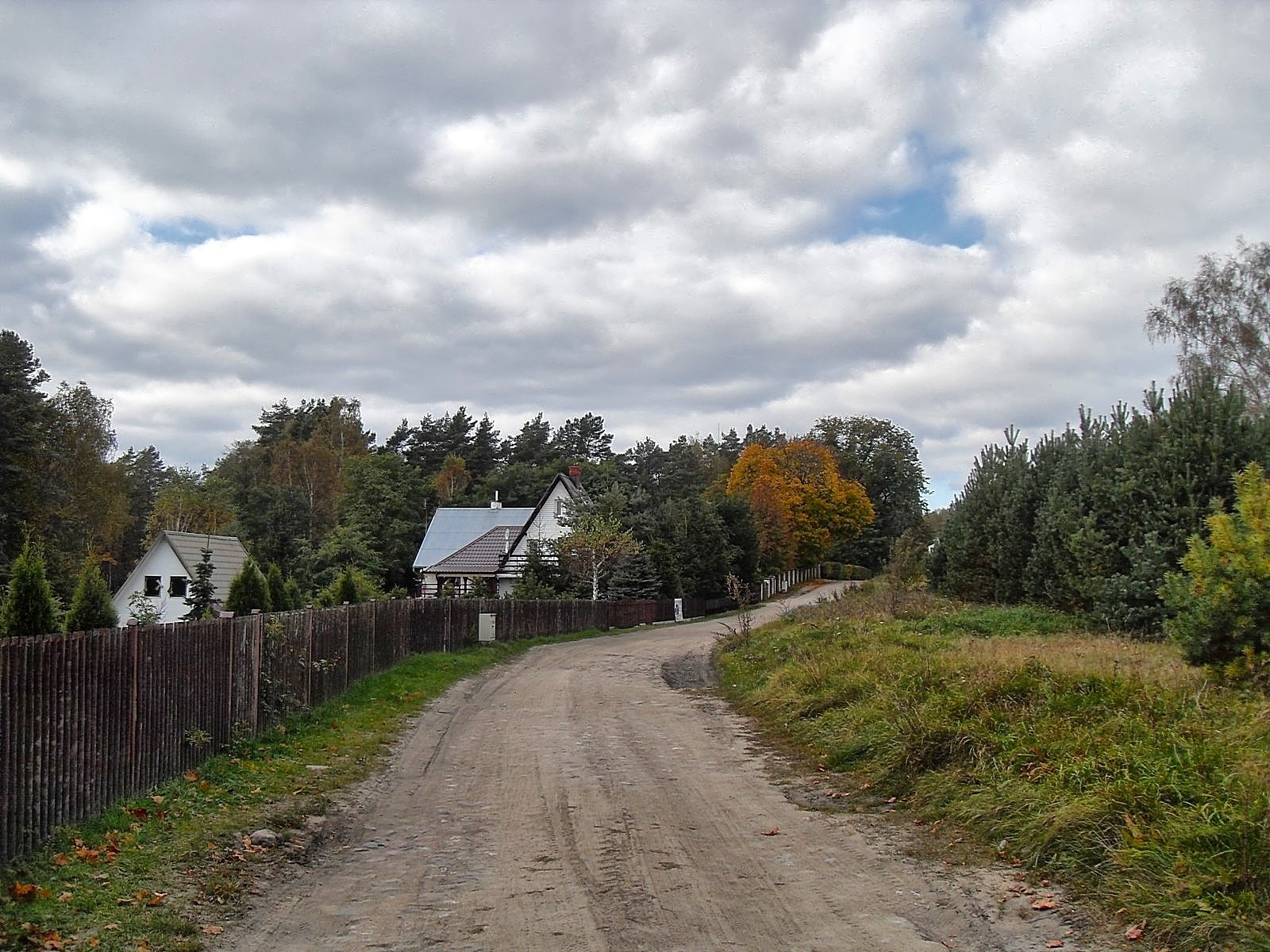
- View of the road leading from Młyńsk to the neighbouring village of Iwiczno

- Location within Poland
- Coordinates: 53°51′59″N 18°15′16″E
- Country: Poland
- Voivodeship: Pomeranian
- County: Starogard
- Gmina: Kaliska
- Population: 8
- Time zone: UTC+1 (CET)
  - Summer (DST): UTC+2 (CEST)
- Vehicle registration: GST

Młyńsk [mwɨɲsk] is a settlement in the administrative district of Gmina Kaliska, within Starogard County, Pomeranian Voivodeship, in northern Poland. It is located within the ethnocultural region of Kociewie in the historic region of Pomerania.
