= Prokocice =

- Village
- Location within Poland
- Coordinates: 50°12′N 20°34′E
- Country: Poland
- Voivodeship: Świętokrzyskie
- County: Kazimierza
- Gmina: Bejsce

Prokocice [prɔkɔˈt͡ɕit͡sɛ] is a village in the administrative district of Gmina Bejsce, within Kazimierza County, Świętokrzyskie Voivodeship, in south-central Poland. It lies approximately 7 km (4 mi) south-west of Bejsce, 11 km (7 mi) south-east of Kazimierza Wielka, and 76 km (47 mi) south of the regional capital Kielce.
