= Zbeltowice =

- Village
- Location within Poland
- Coordinates: 50°15′N 20°34′E
- Country: Poland
- Voivodeship: Świętokrzyskie
- County: Kazimierza
- Gmina: Bejsce

Zbeltowice [zbɛltɔˈvit͡sɛ] is a village in the administrative district of Gmina Bejsce, within Kazimierza County, Świętokrzyskie Voivodeship, in south-central Poland. It lies approximately 4 km (2 mi) west of Bejsce, 7 km (4 mi) south-east of Kazimierza Wielka, and 71 km (44 mi) south of the regional capital Kielce.
