= Jasienica =

Jasienica may refer to the following places in Poland:

- Jasienica, Police - a district of Police, Poland, town in the Pomerania Region
- Jasienica, Lower Silesian Voivodeship (south-west Poland)
- Jasienica, Lublin Voivodeship (east Poland)
- Jasienica, Silesian Voivodeship (south Poland)
- Jasienica, Lesser Poland Voivodeship (south Poland)
- Jasienica, Świętokrzyskie Voivodeship (south-central Poland)
- Jasienica, Gmina Ostrów Mazowiecka in Masovian Voivodeship (east-central Poland)
- Jasienica, Wołomin County in Masovian Voivodeship (east-central Poland)
- Jasienica, Lubusz Voivodeship (west Poland)
- Jasienica Rosielna, current name of Jasienica in Austrian Galicia (south-east Poland)

It may also refer to:

- Paweł Jasienica, pseudonym of Polish journalist and writer Lech Beynar
