= Gmina Kaliska =

Gmina Kaliska Kaliska Commune
- Gmina
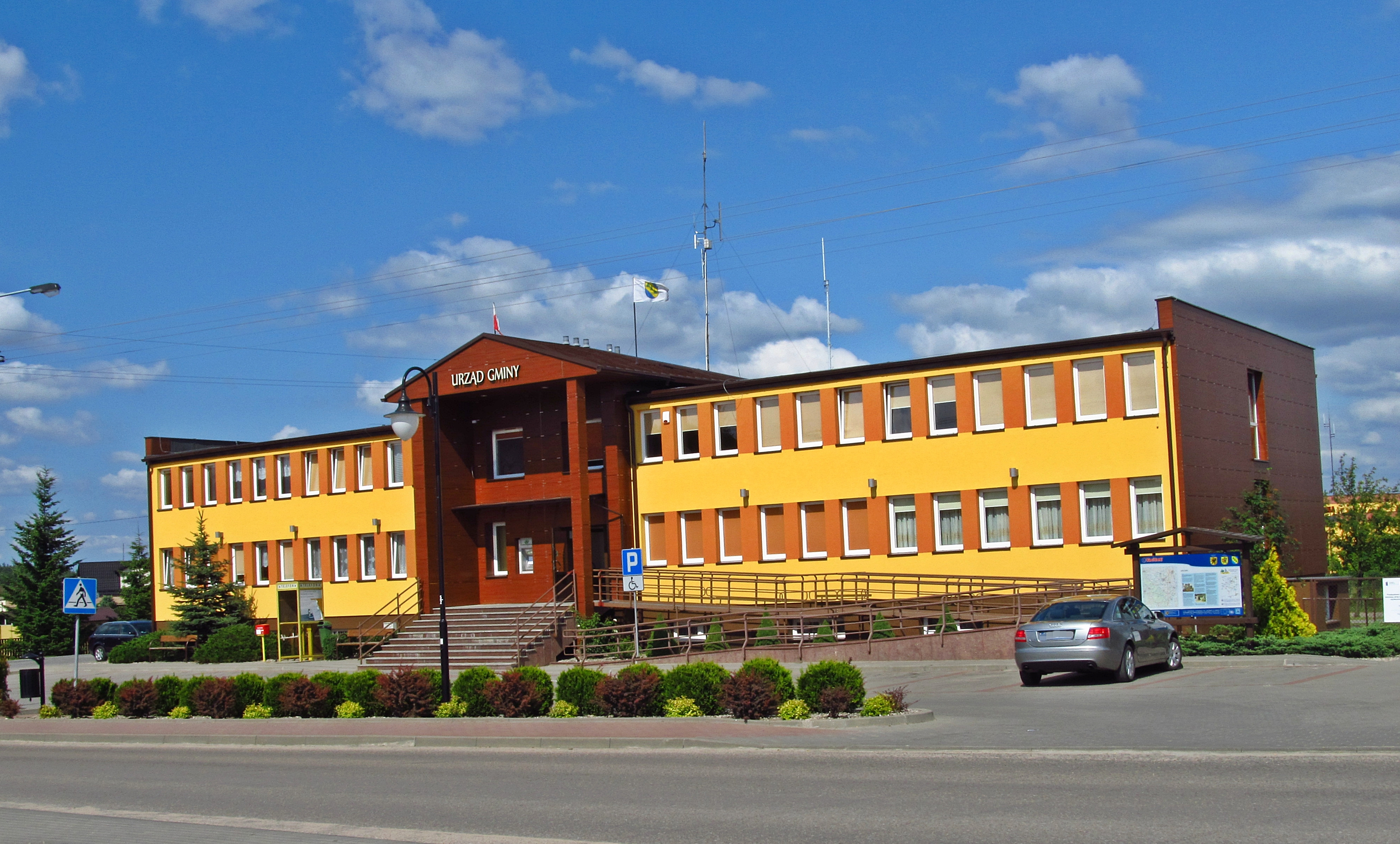
- The seat of the gmina in Kaliska, 2013

- Coat of arms

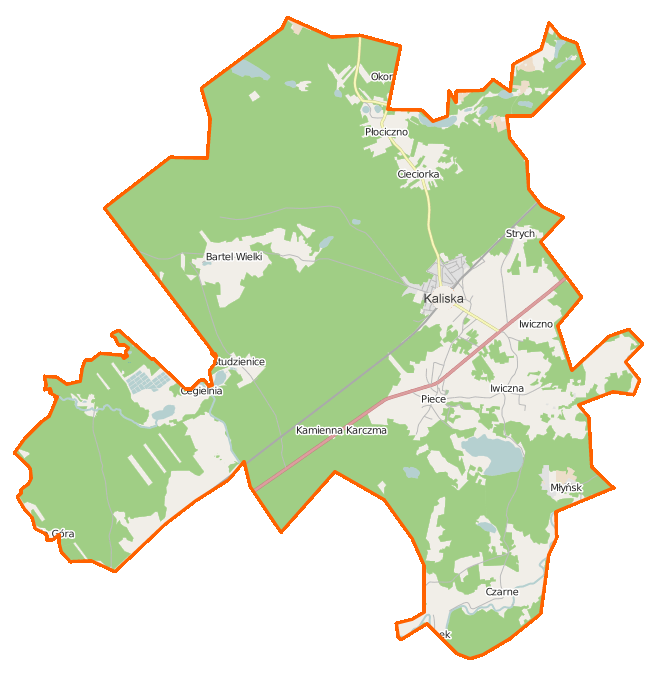
- Coordinates (Kaliska): 53°54′18″N 18°13′6″E
- Country: Poland
- Voivodeship: Pomeranian
- County: Starogard
- Seat: Kaliska

Area
  - Total: 110.36 km^{2} (42.61 sq mi)

Population (2022)
  - Total: 5,341
  - Density: 48.40/km^{2} (125.3/sq mi)
- Website: http://www.kaliska.pl

Gmina Kaliska is a rural gmina (administrative district) in Starogard County, Pomeranian Voivodeship, in northern Poland. Its seat is the village of Kaliska, which lies approximately 22 kilometres (14 mi) west of Starogard Gdański and 58 km (36 mi) south-west of the regional capital Gdańsk.

The gmina covers an area of 110.36 square kilometres (42.6 sq mi), and as of 2022 its total population is 5,341.

== Villages ==
Gmina Kaliska contains the villages and settlements of Bartel Mały, Bartel Wielki, Biedaczek, Cieciorka, Czarne, Dąbrowa, Frank, Iwiczno, Kaliska, Kamienna Karczma, Kazub, Łążek, Leśna Huta, Lipska Karczma, Młyńsk, Okoninki, Piece, Płociczno, Sowi Dół, Strych, Studzienice and Trzechowo.

== Neighbouring gminas ==
Gmina Kaliska is bordered by the gminas of Czersk, Lubichowo, Osieczna, Stara Kiszewa and Zblewo.
