= Kacanka (river) =

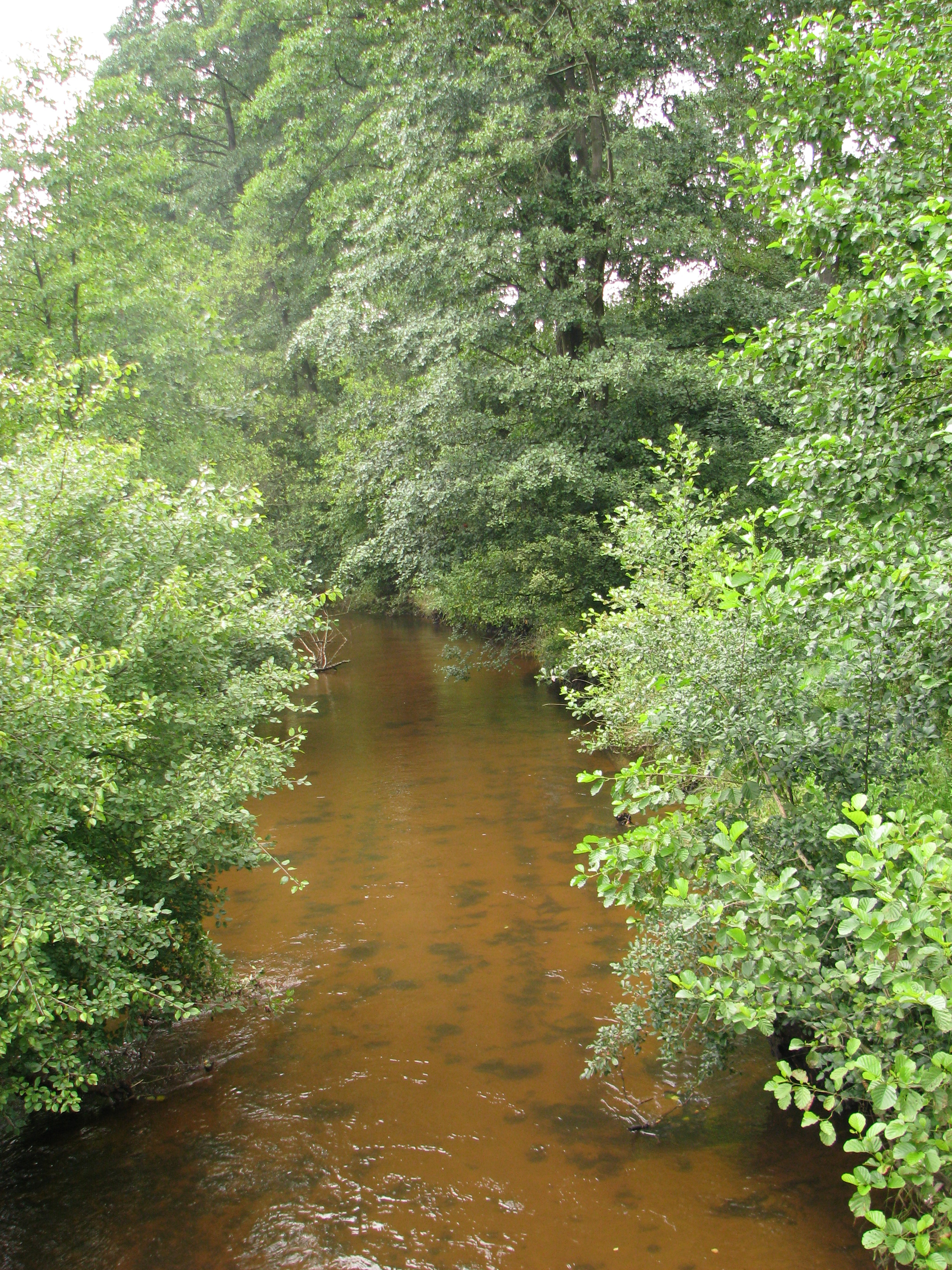

Location
- Country: Poland

Physical characteristics
- Mouth
  - location: Koprzywianka
  - coordinates: 50°35′47″N 21°26′38″E

Basin features
- Progression: Koprzywianka→ Vistula→ Baltic Sea

Kacanka is a river in south central Poland. It's a tributary of the Koprzywianka (at Bazów), which in turn is a tributary of the Vistula near Sandomierz. Its total length is 33.8 kilometres (21.0 mi), and its width is 3 to 8 metres (9.8 to 26.2 ft). Kacanka is known for its fishing, with trout, perch, crucian carp, and roach being common catches.
