= Stretch (surname) =

Stretch is the surname of:

- Bill Stretch (born 1935), Australian former politician
- Billy Stretch (born 1996), Australian rules footballer
- C.J. Stretch (born 1989), American ice hockey player
- Charles Lennox Stretch (1797–1882), South African politician
- Gary Stretch (born 1965), English actor, former boxer and former model
- Jack Stretch (1855–1919), Australian Anglican bishop
- Joe Stretch (born 1982), English writer
- John Stretch (disambiguation)

- John Stretch (MP) for Devon (UK Parliament constituency)

- Peter Stretch (1670–1746), English-American clock maker
- Richard Stretch (1952–2014), South African cricketer
- Rudy Stretch (born 1999), American soccer player
- Steven Stretch (born 1964), former Australian rules footballer
- Thomas Stretch (1697–1765), English-American clock maker, son of Peter Stretch
- Thomas James Stretch (1915–1973), British Army chaplain

== See also ==
- Stretch (nickname)
- Stritch (surname)
