= Lipska =

Lipska may refer to:

== Places ==
- Lipska Karczma in Gmina Kaliska, Poland
- Lipska Wola in Gmina Głowaczów, Poland

== People ==
- Ewa Lipska (born 1945), Polish poet
- Małgorzata Lipska (born 1963), Polish field hockey player
