= Jeziory =

Jeziory may refer to the following places

== Poland ==
- Jeziory, Greater Poland Voivodeship (west-central Poland)
- Jeziory, Lower Silesian Voivodeship (south-west Poland)
- Jeziory, Lublin Voivodeship (east Poland)
- Jeziory, Lubusz Voivodeship (west Poland)
- Jeziory, Masovian Voivodeship (east-central Poland)
- Jeziory, Świętokrzyskie Voivodeship (south-central Poland)

== Ukraine ==
- Velyki Ozera, known in Polish as Jeziory (north-west Ukraine)
