= Czyżowice =

Czyżowice may refer to:

- Czyżowice, Opole Voivodeship (south-west Poland)
- Czyżowice, Silesian Voivodeship (south Poland)
- Czyżowice, Świętokrzyskie Voivodeship (south-central Poland)
