= Skała, Świętokrzyskie Voivodeship =

Skała
- Village
- Location within Poland
- Coordinates: 50°11′39″N 20°33′28″E
- Country: Poland
- Voivodeship: Świętokrzyskie
- County: Kazimierza
- Gmina: Bejsce
- Population: 120

Skała [ˈskawa] is a village in the administrative district of Gmina Bejsce, within Kazimierza County, Świętokrzyskie Voivodeship, in south-central Poland. It lies approximately 8 km (5 mi) south-west of Bejsce, 11 km (7 mi) south-east of Kazimierza Wielka, and 77 km (48 mi) south of the regional capital Kielce.
