= Stojanowice =

- Village
- Location within Poland
- Coordinates: 50°14′N 20°34′E
- Country: Poland
- Voivodeship: Świętokrzyskie
- County: Kazimierza
- Gmina: Bejsce

Stojanowice [stɔjanɔˈvit͡sɛ] is a village in the administrative district of Gmina Bejsce, within Kazimierza County, Świętokrzyskie Voivodeship, in south-central Poland. It lies approximately 5 km (3 mi) south-west of Bejsce, 8 km (5 mi) south-east of Kazimierza Wielka, and 73 km (45 mi) south of the regional capital Kielce.
