= Skwirzowa =

- Village
- Location within Poland
- Coordinates: 50°36′N 21°29′E
- Country: Poland
- Voivodeship: Świętokrzyskie
- County: Sandomierz
- Gmina: Łoniów

Skwirzowa [skfiˈʐɔva] is a village in the administrative district of Gmina Łoniów, within Sandomierz County, Świętokrzyskie Voivodeship, in south-central Poland. It lies approximately 5 km (3 mi) north-west of Łoniów, 21 km (13 mi) south-west of Sandomierz, and 69 km (43 mi) south-east of the regional capital Kielce.
