= Grodowice =

- Village
- Location within Poland
- Coordinates: 50°16′1″N 20°35′20″E
- Country: Poland
- Voivodeship: Świętokrzyskie
- County: Kazimierza
- Gmina: Bejsce

Grodowice [ɡrɔdɔˈvit͡sɛ] is a village in the administrative district of Gmina Bejsce, within Kazimierza County, Świętokrzyskie Voivodeship, in south-central Poland. It lies approximately 3 km (2 mi) north-west of Bejsce, 8 km (5 mi) east of Kazimierza Wielka, and 69 km (43 mi) south of the regional capital Kielce.
