= Chodków Stary =

- Village
- Location within Poland
- Coordinates: 50°31′55″N 21°35′48″E
- Country: Poland
- Voivodeship: Świętokrzyskie
- County: Sandomierz
- Gmina: Łoniów
- Population: 180

Chodków Stary [ˈxɔtkuf ˈstarɨ] is a village in the administrative district of Gmina Łoniów, within Sandomierz County, Świętokrzyskie Voivodeship, in south-central Poland. It lies approximately 7 km (4 mi) south-east of Łoniów, 20 km (12 mi) south-west of Sandomierz, and 80 km (50 mi) south-east of the regional capital Kielce.
