= Ruszcza-Płaszczyzna =

- Village
- Location within Poland
- Coordinates: 50°34′33″N 21°28′24″E
- Country: Poland
- Voivodeship: Świętokrzyskie
- County: Sandomierz
- Gmina: Łoniów

Ruszcza-Płaszczyzna [ˈruʂt͡ʂa pwaʂˈt͡ʂɨzna] is a village in the administrative district of Gmina Łoniów, within Sandomierz County, Świętokrzyskie Voivodeship, in south-central Poland. It lies approximately 4 km (2 mi) west of Łoniów, 23 km (14 mi) south-west of Sandomierz, and 70 km (43 mi) south-east of the regional capital Kielce.
