= Skrzypaczowice =

- Village
- Location within Poland
- Coordinates: 50°34′18″N 21°33′3″E
- Country: Poland
- Voivodeship: Świętokrzyskie
- County: Sandomierz
- Gmina: Łoniów

Skrzypaczowice [skʂɨpat͡ʂɔˈvit͡sɛ] is a village in the administrative district of Gmina Łoniów, within Sandomierz County, Świętokrzyskie Voivodeship, in south-central Poland. It lies approximately 3 km (2 mi) north-east of Łoniów, 19 km (12 mi) south-west of Sandomierz, and 75 km (47 mi) south-east of the regional capital Kielce.
