= Piotrkowice =

Piotrkowice may refer to the following places in Poland:

- Piotrkowice, Lower Silesian Voivodeship (south-west Poland)
- Piotrkowice, Kuyavian-Pomeranian Voivodeship (north-central Poland)
- Piotrkowice, Lesser Poland Voivodeship (south Poland)
- Piotrkowice, Jędrzejów County in Świętokrzyskie Voivodeship (south-central Poland)
- Piotrkowice, Kazimierza County in Świętokrzyskie Voivodeship (south-central Poland)
- Piotrkowice, Kielce County in Świętokrzyskie Voivodeship (south-central Poland)
- Piotrkowice, Gmina Żabia Wola, Grodzisk County in Masovian Voivodeship (east-central Poland)
- Piotrkowice, Kozienice County in Masovian Voivodeship (east-central Poland)
- Piotrkowice, Konin County in Greater Poland Voivodeship (west-central Poland)
- Piotrkowice, Kościan County in Greater Poland Voivodeship (west-central Poland)
- Piotrkowice, Wągrowiec County in Greater Poland Voivodeship (west-central Poland)
