= Stretcher (disambiguation) =

A stretcher is a medical device used to carry a person from one place to another.

Stretcher may also refer to:

- Stretcher (furniture), a horizontal support element of an item of furniture
- In brickwork, a brick laid with its long narrow side exposed
- Procrustes or "the stretcher", a smith and bandit in Greek mythology who stretched some of his victims to fit a bed
- "Stretcher" or "The Stretcher", nickname of American professional wrestler Barry Horowitz
- Stretcher (G.I. Joe), a fictional character in the G.I. Joe universe

== See also ==
- Stretcher bar, used by an artist to construct a wooden stretcher frame to mount a canvas
- Stretch (disambiguation)
- Stretching (disambiguation)
