= Świniary Stare =

- Village
- Location within Poland
- Coordinates: 50°32′47″N 21°31′56″E
- Country: Poland
- Voivodeship: Świętokrzyskie
- County: Sandomierz
- Gmina: Łoniów
- Population: 600

Świniary Stare [ɕfiˈɲarɨ ˈstarɛ] is a village in the administrative district of Gmina Łoniów, within Sandomierz County, Świętokrzyskie Voivodeship, in south-central Poland. It lies approximately 3 km (2 mi) south of Łoniów, 22 km (14 mi) south-west of Sandomierz, and 75 km (47 mi) south-east of the regional capital Kielce.
