= Wnorów =

Wnorów may refer to the following places in Poland:

- Wnorów, Lower Silesian Voivodeship (south-west Poland)
- Wnorów, Świętokrzyskie Voivodeship (south-central Poland)
