= Kijany, Świętokrzyskie Voivodeship =

Kijany
- Village
- Location within Poland
- Coordinates: 50°12′47″N 20°37′18″E
- Country: Poland
- Voivodeship: Świętokrzyskie
- County: Kazimierza
- Gmina: Bejsce

Kijany [kiˈjanɨ] is a village in the administrative district of Gmina Bejsce, within Kazimierza County, Świętokrzyskie Voivodeship, in south-central Poland. It lies approximately 5 km (3 mi) south of Bejsce, 12 km (7 mi) south-east of Kazimierza Wielka, and 75 km (47 mi) south of the regional capital Kielce.
