= Gągolin =

- Village
- Location within Poland
- Coordinates: 50°31′N 21°34′E
- Country: Poland
- Voivodeship: Świętokrzyskie
- County: Sandomierz
- Gmina: Łoniów

Gągolin [ɡɔnˈɡɔlin] is a village in the administrative district of Gmina Łoniów, within Sandomierz County, Świętokrzyskie Voivodeship, in south-central Poland. It lies approximately 7 kilometres (4.3 mi) south-east of Łoniów, 23 km (14.3 mi) south-west of Sandomierz, and 79 km (49.1 mi) south-east of the regional capital Kielce.
