= Morawianki =

- Village
- Location within Poland
- Coordinates: 50°13′16″N 20°37′58″E
- Country: Poland
- Voivodeship: Świętokrzyskie
- County: Kazimierza
- Gmina: Bejsce

Morawianki [mɔraˈvjaŋki] is a village in the administrative district of Gmina Bejsce, within Kazimierza County, Świętokrzyskie Voivodeship, in south-central Poland. It lies approximately 4 km (2 mi) south of Bejsce, 13 km (8 mi) south-east of Kazimierza Wielka, and 74 km (46 mi) south of the regional capital Kielce.
