= Wojcieszyce =

Wojcieszyce may refer to the following places in Poland:

- Wojcieszyce, Lower Silesian Voivodeship (south-west Poland)
- Wojcieszyce, Świętokrzyskie Voivodeship (south-central Poland)
- Wojcieszyce, Lubusz Voivodeship (west Poland)
