= Łążek =

Łążek may refer to the following places:

- Łążek, Kuyavian-Pomeranian Voivodeship (north-central Poland)
- Łążek, Łódź Voivodeship (central Poland)
- Łążek, Świętokrzyskie Voivodeship (south-east Poland)
- Łążek, Subcarpathian Voivodeship (south-east Poland)
- Łążek, Masovian Voivodeship (north-central Poland)
- Łążek, Greater Poland Voivodeship (central Poland)
- Łążek, Pomeranian Voivodeship (north Poland)
- Łążek, Warmian-Masurian Voivodeship (north Poland)
