= Trzebiesławice, Świętokrzyskie Voivodeship =

Trzebiesławice
- Village
- Location within Poland
- Coordinates: 50°34′29″N 21°30′22″E
- Country: Poland
- Voivodeship: Świętokrzyskie
- County: Sandomierz
- Gmina: Łoniów
- Population: 240

Trzebiesławice [tʂɛbjɛswaˈvit͡sɛ] is a village in the administrative district of Gmina Łoniów, within Sandomierz County, Świętokrzyskie Voivodeship, in south-central Poland. It lies approximately 2 km (1 mi) north-west of Łoniów, 22 km (14 mi) south-west of Sandomierz, and 72 km (45 mi) south-east of the regional capital Kielce.
