= Ruszcza-Kolonia =

- Village
- Location within Poland
- Coordinates: 50°34′0″N 21°28′0″E
- Country: Poland
- Voivodeship: Świętokrzyskie
- County: Sandomierz
- Gmina: Łoniów

Ruszcza-Kolonia [ˈruʂt͡ʂa kɔˈlɔɲa] is a village in the administrative district of Gmina Łoniów, within Sandomierz County, Świętokrzyskie Voivodeship, in south-central Poland. It lies approximately 5 km (3 mi) west of Łoniów, 24 km (15 mi) south-west of Sandomierz, and 70 km (43 mi) south-east of the regional capital Kielce.
