= Przewłoka =

Przewłoka may refer to the following villages in Poland:

- Przewłoka, Parczew County in Lublin Voivodeship (east Poland)
- Przewłoka, Gmina Jarczów, Tomaszów County in Lublin Voivodeship (east Poland)
- Przewłoka, Pomeranian Voivodeship (north Poland)
- Przewłoka, Świętokrzyskie Voivodeship (south-central Poland)
- Przewłoka, Podlaskie Voivodeship (north-east Poland)
