= Krowia Góra =

- Village
- Location within Poland
- Coordinates: 50°33′34″N 21°33′13″E
- Country: Poland
- Voivodeship: Świętokrzyskie
- County: Sandomierz
- Gmina: Łoniów

Krowia Góra [ˈkrɔvja ˈɡura] is a village in the administrative district of Gmina Łoniów, within Sandomierz County, Świętokrzyskie Voivodeship, in south-central Poland. It lies approximately 3 km (2 mi) east of Łoniów, 20 km (12 mi) south-west of Sandomierz, and 76 km (47 mi) south-east of the regional capital Kielce.
