= Dobiesławice, Świętokrzyskie Voivodeship =

Dobiesławice
- Village
- Location within Poland
- Coordinates: 50°13′5″N 20°34′18″E
- Country: Poland
- Voivodeship: Świętokrzyskie
- County: Kazimierza
- Gmina: Bejsce

Dobiesławice [dɔbjɛswaˈvit͡sɛ] is a village in the administrative district of Gmina Bejsce, within Kazimierza County, Świętokrzyskie Voivodeship, in south-central Poland. It lies approximately 5 km (3 mi) south-west of Bejsce, 9 km (6 mi) south-east of Kazimierza Wielka, and 74 km (46 mi) south of the regional capital Kielce.
