= Stretch =

Stretch may refer to:

== People ==
- Stretch (surname), a list of people
- Stretch (nickname), a list

== Music ==
- Stretch Records, an independent record label
- Stretch (band), a 1970s UK rock band
- Stretch (rapper) (1968–1995), American rapper and producer
- Stretch (album), an album by Scott Walker, 1973
- "The Stretch", a song by Liquid Tension Experiment from the album Liquid Tension Experiment, 1998

== Films ==
- Stretch (2011 film), a French film directed by Charles de Meaux
- Stretch (2014 film), an American film directed by Joe Carnahan

== Fictional characters ==
- Stretch Armstrong, an action figure introduced in 1976
- Stretch, a purple toy octopus in the film Toy Story 3 (see List of Toy Story characters)
- Stretch, a member of the DC Comics superteam Hero Hotline
- Stretch Cunningham, a recurring character in the TV series All in the Family
- Stretch Emerson, a character created by Australian western writer Leonard Frank Meares
- Stretch (The Texas Chainsaw Massacre 2), the sole survivor of The Texas Chainsaw Massacre 2
- Stretch, a tape measure in Handy Manny

== Other uses ==
- Stretch, the codename of version 9 of the Debian Linux operating system
- Another name for the "set position", one of two legal pitching positions in baseball
- Another name for a limousine
- IBM 7030 Stretch, IBM's first transistorized supercomputer
- Stretch Island, in the U.S. state of Washington
- The Stretch (novel), a thriller by Stephen Leather, published in 2000
- The Stretch (TV series), a British television crime drama mini-series
- A variety of the game mumblety-peg
- Stretch, a robot made by Boston Dynamics

== See also ==
- Elongation (disambiguation)
- Stretching (disambiguation)
- Stritch (disambiguation)
