= Czarne (disambiguation) =

Czarne may refer to the following places:

- Czarne, Kuyavian-Pomeranian Voivodeship (north-central Poland)
- Czarne, Podlaskie Voivodeship (north-east Poland)
- Czarne in Pomeranian Voivodeship (north Poland)
- Czarne, Lesser Poland Voivodeship (south Poland)
- Czarne, Kościerzyna County in Pomeranian Voivodeship (north Poland)
- Czarne, Gmina Kaliska in Pomeranian Voivodeship (north Poland)
- Czarne, Gmina Skórcz in Pomeranian Voivodeship (north Poland)
- Czarne, Gołdap County in Warmian-Masurian Voivodeship (north Poland)
- Czarne, Pisz County in Warmian-Masurian Voivodeship (north Poland)
- Czarne, West Pomeranian Voivodeship (north-west Poland)
