= Zawidza =

- Village
- Location within Poland
- Coordinates: 50°32′9″N 21°29′45″E
- Country: Poland
- Voivodeship: Świętokrzyskie
- County: Sandomierz
- Gmina: Łoniów

Zawidza [zaˈvid͡za] is a village in the administrative district of Gmina Łoniów, within Sandomierz County, Świętokrzyskie Voivodeship, in south-central Poland. It lies approximately 4 km (2 mi) south-west of Łoniów, 25 km (16 mi) south-west of Sandomierz, and 73 km (45 mi) south-east of the regional capital Kielce.
