= Wólka Gieraszowska =

- Village
- Location within Poland
- Coordinates: 50°36′40″N 21°27′56″E
- Country: Poland
- Voivodeship: Świętokrzyskie
- County: Sandomierz
- Gmina: Łoniów

Wólka Gieraszowska [ˈvulka ɡʲɛraˈʂɔfska] is a village in the administrative district of Gmina Łoniów, within Sandomierz County, Świętokrzyskie Voivodeship, in south-central Poland. It lies approximately 7 km (4 mi) north-west of Łoniów, 22 km (14 mi) west of Sandomierz, and 67 km (42 mi) south-east of the regional capital Kielce.
