= Uściszowice =

- Village
- Location within Poland
- Coordinates: 50°14′N 20°39′E
- Country: Poland
- Voivodeship: Świętokrzyskie
- County: Kazimierza
- Gmina: Bejsce

Uściszowice [uɕt͡ɕiʂɔˈvit͡sɛ] is a village in the administrative district of Gmina Bejsce, within Kazimierza County, Świętokrzyskie Voivodeship, in south-central Poland. It lies approximately 4 km (2 mi) south-east of Bejsce, 13 km (8 mi) east of Kazimierza Wielka, and 73 km (45 mi) south of the regional capital Kielce.
