= Suliszów, Sandomierz County =

Suliszów
- Village
- Location within Poland
- Coordinates: 50°34′34″N 21°29′30″E
- Country: Poland
- Voivodeship: Świętokrzyskie
- County: Sandomierz
- Gmina: Łoniów
- Population: 290

Suliszów [suˈliʂuf] is a village in the administrative district of Gmina Łoniów, within Sandomierz County, Świętokrzyskie Voivodeship, in south-central Poland. It lies approximately 3 km (2 mi) north-west of Łoniów, 22 km (14 mi) south-west of Sandomierz, and 71 km (44 mi) south-east of the regional capital Kielce.
