= Sulisławice, Świętokrzyskie Voivodeship =

Sulisławice
- Village
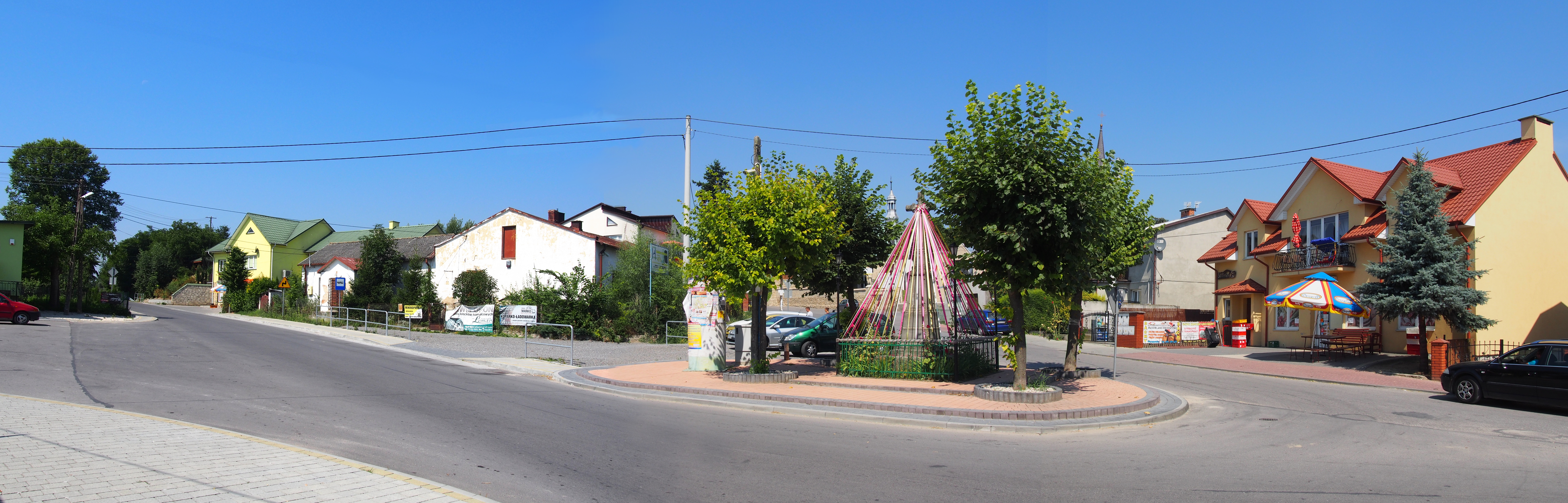

- Location within Poland
- Coordinates: 50°35′11″N 21°28′9″E
- Country: Poland
- Voivodeship: Świętokrzyskie
- County: Sandomierz
- Gmina: Łoniów
- Population: 430

Sulisławice [suliswaˈvit͡sɛ] is a village in the administrative district of Gmina Łoniów, within Sandomierz County, Świętokrzyskie Voivodeship, in south-central Poland. It lies approximately 5 km (3 mi) north-west of Łoniów, 23 km (14 mi) south-west of Sandomierz, and 69 km (43 mi) south-east of the regional capital Kielce.
