= Lazek =

Lazek may refer to:

- Łazek, Poland
- Łążek (disambiguation)

== See also ==
- Lasek (disambiguation)
