= Sędziszowice =

- Village
- Location within Poland
- Coordinates: 50°12′17″N 20°35′13″E
- Country: Poland
- Voivodeship: Świętokrzyskie
- County: Kazimierza
- Gmina: Bejsce

Sędziszowice [sɛnd͡ʑiʂɔˈvit͡sɛ] is a village in the administrative district of Gmina Bejsce, within Kazimierza County, Świętokrzyskie Voivodeship, in south-central Poland. It lies approximately 6 km (4 mi) south-west of Bejsce, 11 km (7 mi) south-east of Kazimierza Wielka, and 76 km (47 mi) south of the regional capital Kielce.
