= Morawiany =

- Village
- Location within Poland
- Coordinates: 50°13′38″N 20°37′7″E
- Country: Poland
- Voivodeship: Świętokrzyskie
- County: Kazimierza
- Gmina: Bejsce

Morawiany [mɔraˈvjanɨ] is a village in the administrative district of Gmina Bejsce, within Kazimierza County, Świętokrzyskie Voivodeship, in south-central Poland. It lies approximately 3 km (2 mi) south of Bejsce, 11 km (7 mi) south-east of Kazimierza Wielka, and 73 km (45 mi) south of the regional capital Kielce.
