= Trzechowo =

Village in Pomeranian Voivodeship, Poland

- Village
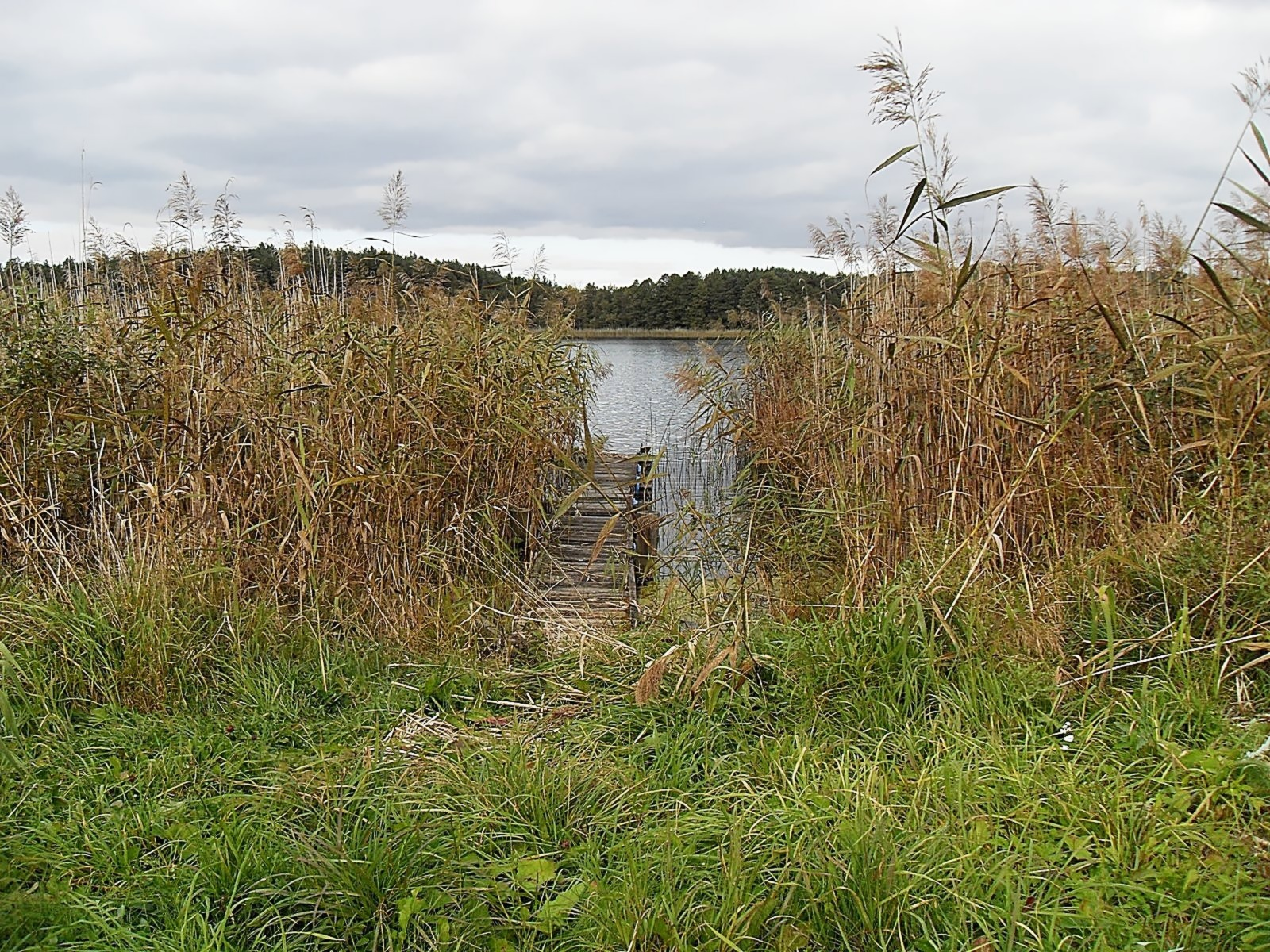
- A view of the lake by the village

- Location within Poland
- Coordinates: 53°52′12″N 18°13′48″E
- Country: Poland
- Voivodeship: Pomeranian
- County: Starogard
- Gmina: Kaliska

Population
  - Total: 4
- Time zone: UTC+1 (CET)
  - Summer (DST): UTC+2 (CEST)
- Vehicle registration: GST

Trzechowo [tʂɛˈxɔvɔ] is a village in the administrative district of Gmina Kaliska, within Starogard County, Pomeranian Voivodeship, in northern Poland. It is located in the ethnocultural region of Kociewie in the historic region of Pomerania.
