= Bartel Wielki =

Village in Pomeranian Voivodeship, Poland

- Village
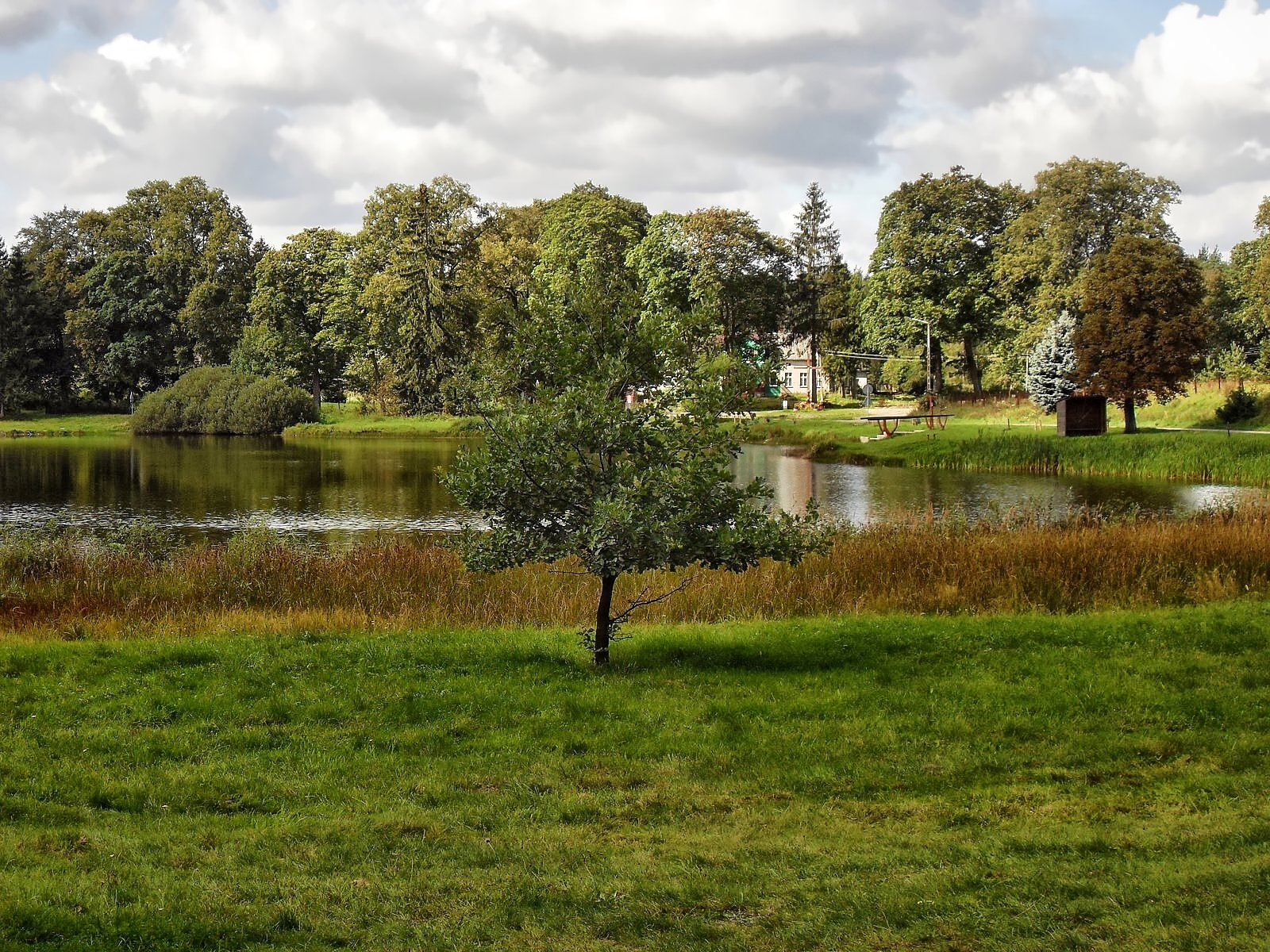
- Pond in Bartel Wielki

- Location within Poland
- Coordinates: 53°54′47″N 18°8′44″E
- Country: Poland
- Voivodeship: Pomeranian
- County: Starogard
- Gmina: Kaliska
- Highest elevation: 158 m (518 ft)
- Lowest elevation: 142 m (466 ft)

Population
  - Total: 142
- Time zone: UTC+1 (CET)
  - Summer (DST): UTC+2 (CEST)
- Vehicle registration: GST

Bartel Wielki (Polish pronunciation: [ˈbartɛl ˈvjɛlkʲi]) is a village in the administrative district of Gmina Kaliska, within Starogard County, Pomeranian Voivodeship, in northern Poland. It is located in the ethnocultural region of Kociewie in the historic region of Pomerania.
