= Stretching (disambiguation) =

Stretching is a form of physical exercise in which a specific skeletal muscle is deliberately elongated to its fullest length.

Stretching may also refer to:

- Canvas stretching, the lengthening of a canvas by pulling
- Scaling (geometry) in one direction
- Stretching (body piercing), the deliberate expansion of a healed fistula for the purpose of wearing body piercing jewelry
- Stretching the truth
- Vortex stretching, the lengthening of vortices in three-dimensional fluid flow

== See also ==
- Stretch (disambiguation)
- Stretcher (disambiguation)
