= Łążek, Świętokrzyskie Voivodeship =

Łążek
- Village
- Location within Poland
- Coordinates: 50°31′34″N 21°34′56″E
- Country: Poland
- Voivodeship: Świętokrzyskie
- County: Sandomierz
- Gmina: Łoniów

Łążek [ˈwɔ̃ʐɛk] is a village in the administrative district of Gmina Łoniów, within Sandomierz County, Świętokrzyskie Voivodeship, in south-central Poland. It lies approximately 6 km (4 mi) south-east of Łoniów, 22 km (14 mi) south-west of Sandomierz, and 79 km (49 mi) south-east of the regional capital Kielce.
