= Lasek =

Lasek may refer to:

== Acronyms ==
- LASEK or photorefractive keratectomy, a laser eye surgery technique

== Settlements ==
=== Villages and hamlets ===
- Lasek, Lower Silesian Voivodeship (south-west Poland)
- Lasek, Kuyavian-Pomeranian Voivodeship (north-central Poland)
- Lasek, Łódź Voivodeship (central Poland)
- Lasek, Lesser Poland Voivodeship (south Poland)
- Lasek, Gostynin County in Masovian Voivodeship (east-central Poland)
- Lasek, Gmina Żabia Wola, Grodzisk County in Masovian Voivodeship (east-central Poland)
- Lasek, Otwock County in Masovian Voivodeship (east-central Poland)
- Lasek, Pomeranian Voivodeship (north Poland)
- Lasek, Kraśnik County in Lublin Voivodeship (east Poland)
- Lasek, Łuków County in Lublin Voivodeship (east Poland)

=== Districts ===
- Lasek, a district of Luboń
- Lasek, a district of Piwniczna-Zdrój
- Lasek, a district of Tyczyn

== Persons ==
- Bucky Lasek, American skateboarder

== See also ==
- Lazek (disambiguation)
- Lasix (furosemide)
