= Stretch (nickname) =

Stretch is a nickname of:

== People ==
- Stretch Johnson (1915–2002), American tap dancer and social activist
- Seantavius Jones (born 1992), American football player
- Stretch Kontelj (born 1961), Australian politician
- Alvin Martin (born 1958), English footballer
- Willie McCovey (1938–2018), American baseball player
- Stretch Miller (1910–1972), American sports broadcaster
- Stretch Murphy (1907–1992), American basketball player
- Jake Pelkington (1916–1982), American basketball player
- Jack Phillips (first baseman) (1921–2009), American baseball player
- Howie Schultz (1922–2009), American baseball and basketball player
- Ron Tompkins (1944–2023), American baseball pitcher
- Augie Vander Meulen (1909–1993), American basketball player

== Fictional characters ==
- Vanita "Stretch" Brock, the protagonist of The Texas Chainsaw Massacre 2, played by Caroline Williams
- Stretch Cunningham, a recurring character in the TV series All in the Family
- Stretch Snodgrass, in the radio/TV series Our Miss Brooks

== See also ==
- Stretch (disambiguation)
- Stretch (surname)
