= Jasienica, Świętokrzyskie Voivodeship =

Jasienica
- Village
- Location within Poland
- Coordinates: 50°33′N 21°33′E
- Country: Poland
- Voivodeship: Świętokrzyskie
- County: Sandomierz
- Gmina: Łoniów

Jasienica [jaɕɛˈnit͡sa] is a village in the administrative district of Gmina Łoniów, within Sandomierz County, Świętokrzyskie Voivodeship, in south-central Poland. It lies approximately 3 km (2 mi) south-east of Łoniów, 21 km (13 mi) south-west of Sandomierz, and 76 km (47 mi) south-east of the regional capital Kielce.
