= Jeziory, Świętokrzyskie Voivodeship =

Jeziory
- Village
- Location within Poland
- Coordinates: 50°34′38″N 21°27′21″E
- Country: Poland
- Voivodeship: Świętokrzyskie
- County: Sandomierz
- Gmina: Łoniów

Jeziory [jɛˈʑɔrɨ] is a village in the administrative district of Gmina Łoniów, within Sandomierz County, Świętokrzyskie Voivodeship, in south-central Poland. It lies approximately 6 km (4 mi) west of Łoniów, 24 km (15 mi) south-west of Sandomierz, and 69 km (43 mi) south-east of the regional capital Kielce.
