= Królewice, Kazimierza County =

Królewice
- Village
- Location within Poland
- Coordinates: 50°15′13″N 20°38′3″E
- Country: Poland
- Voivodeship: Świętokrzyskie
- County: Kazimierza
- Gmina: Bejsce

Królewice [krulɛˈvit͡sɛ] is a village in the administrative district of Gmina Bejsce, within Kazimierza County, Świętokrzyskie Voivodeship, in south-central Poland. It lies approximately 2 km (1 mi) east of Bejsce, 11 km (7 mi) east of Kazimierza Wielka, and 70 km (43 mi) south of the regional capital Kielce.
