= Łoniów-Kolonia =

- Village
- Location within Poland
- Coordinates: 50°33′25″N 21°30′33″E
- Country: Poland
- Voivodeship: Świętokrzyskie
- County: Sandomierz
- Gmina: Łoniów

Łoniów-Kolonia [ˈwɔɲuf kɔˈlɔɲa] is a village in the administrative district of Gmina Łoniów, within Sandomierz County, Świętokrzyskie Voivodeship, in south-central Poland.
