= Wojcieszyce, Świętokrzyskie Voivodeship =

Wojcieszyce
- Village
- Location within Poland
- Coordinates: 50°35′4″N 21°26′37″E
- Country: Poland
- Voivodeship: Świętokrzyskie
- County: Sandomierz
- Gmina: Łoniów

Wojcieszyce (Polish pronunciation: [vɔjt͡ɕɛˈʂɨt͡sɛ]) is a village in the administrative district of Gmina Łoniów, within Sandomierz County, Świętokrzyskie Voivodeship, in south-central Poland. It lies approximately 7 km (4 mi) west of Łoniów, 25 km (16 mi) south-west of Sandomierz, and 68 km (42 mi) south-east of the regional capital Kielce.
