= Kaliska, Gmina Kaliska =

Village in Pomeranian Voivodeship, Poland

Kaliska
- Village
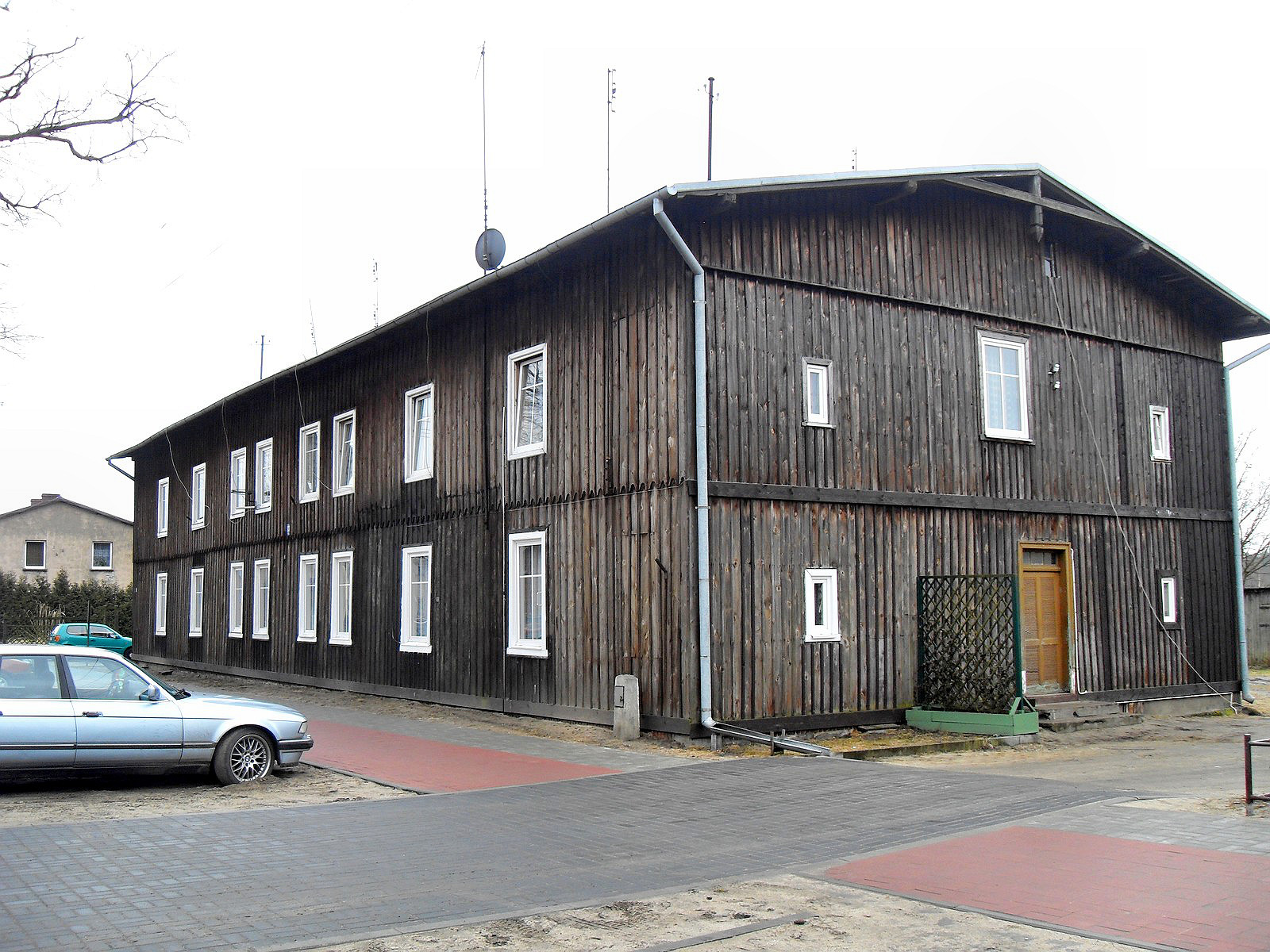
- A timber framed residence known as the ‘Belvedere Palace’ in Kaliska

- Location within Poland
- Coordinates: 53°54′18″N 18°13′6″E
- Country: Poland
- Voivodeship: Pomeranian
- County: Starogard
- Gmina: Kaliska
- Highest elevation: 151 m (495 ft)
- Lowest elevation: 145 m (476 ft)

Population
  - Total: 2,189
- Time zone: UTC+1 (CET)
  - Summer (DST): UTC+2 (CEST)
- Vehicle registration: GST

Kaliska [kaˈliska] is a village in Starogard County, Pomeranian Voivodeship, in northern Poland. It is the seat of the gmina (administrative district) called Gmina Kaliska. It is located within the ethnocultural region of Kociewie in the historic region of Pomerania.

Six Polish citizens were murdered by Nazi Germany in the village during World War II.
