= Gmina Bejsce =

Gmina Bejsce Bejsce Commune
- Gmina
- Flag Coat of arms
- Interactive map of Gmina Bejsce
- Coordinates (Bejsce): 50°15′N 20°37′E
- Country: Poland
- Voivodeship: Świętokrzyskie
- County: Kazimierza
- Seat: Bejsce

Area
  - Total: 57.74 km^{2} (22.29 sq mi)

Population (2006)
  - Total: 4,306
  - Density: 74.58/km^{2} (193.2/sq mi)
- Website: http://www.bip.gminy.com.pl/bejsce/

Gmina Bejsce is a rural gmina (administrative district) in Kazimierza County, Świętokrzyskie Voivodeship, in south-central Poland. Its seat is the village of Bejsce, which lies approximately 10 kilometres (6 mi) east of Kazimierza Wielka and 71 km (44 mi) south of the regional capital Kielce.

The gmina covers an area of 57.74 square kilometres (22.3 sq mi), and as of 2006 its total population is 4,306.

== Villages ==
Gmina Bejsce contains the villages and settlements of Bejsce, Brończyce, Czyżowice, Dobiesławice, Grodowice, Kaczkowice, Kijany, Królewice, Morawianki, Morawiany, Piotrkowice, Prokocice, Sędziszowice, Skała, Stojanowice, Uściszowice and Zbeltowice.

== Neighbouring gminas ==
Gmina Bejsce is bordered by the gminas of Kazimierza Wielka, Koszyce and Opatowiec.
