= Wnorów, Świętokrzyskie Voivodeship =

Wnorów
- Village
- Location within Poland
- Coordinates: 50°34′0″N 21°29′5″E
- Country: Poland
- Voivodeship: Świętokrzyskie
- County: Sandomierz
- Gmina: Łoniów
- Population: 300

Wnorów [ˈvnɔruf] is a village in the administrative district of Gmina Łoniów, within Sandomierz County, Świętokrzyskie Voivodeship, in south-central Poland. It lies approximately 3 km (2 mi) west of Łoniów, 23 km (14 mi) south-west of Sandomierz, and 71 km (44 mi) south-east of the regional capital Kielce.
