= Czyżowice, Świętokrzyskie Voivodeship =

Czyżowice
- Village
- Location within Poland
- Coordinates: 50°15′45″N 20°37′11″E
- Country: Poland
- Voivodeship: Świętokrzyskie
- County: Kazimierza
- Gmina: Bejsce

Czyżowice [t͡ʂɨʐɔˈvit͡sɛ] is a village in the administrative district of Gmina Bejsce, within Kazimierza County, Świętokrzyskie Voivodeship, in south-central Poland. It lies about 2 km (1 mi) north of Bejsce, 10 km (6 mi) east of Kazimierza Wielka, and 69 km (43 mi) south of the regional capital Kielce.
