= Gmina Łoniów =

Gmina Łoniów Łoniów Commune
- Gmina
- Coat of arms

- Location within Poland
- Coordinates (Łoniów): 50°33′50″N 21°31′27″E
- Country: Poland
- Voivodeship: Świętokrzyskie
- County: Sandomierz
- Seat: Łoniów

Area
  - Total: 86.99 km^{2} (33.59 sq mi)

Population (2013)
  - Total: 7,542
  - Density: 86.70/km^{2} (224.6/sq mi)
- Website: http://www.loniow.pl

Gmina Łoniów is a rural gmina (administrative district) in Sandomierz County, Świętokrzyskie Voivodeship, in south-central Poland. Its seat is the village of Łoniów, which lies approximately 21 kilometres (13 mi) south-west of Sandomierz and 74 km (46 mi) south-east of the regional capital Kielce.

The gmina covers an area of 86.99 square kilometres (33.6 sq mi), and as of 2006 its total population is 7,513 (7,542 in 2013).

== Villages ==
Gmina Łoniów contains the villages and settlements of Bazów, Bogoria, Chodków Nowy, Chodków Stary, Gągolin, Gieraszowice, Jasienica, Jeziory, Kępa Nagnajewska, Królewice, Krowia Góra, Łążek, Łoniów, Łoniów-Kolonia, Otoka, Piaseczno, Przewłoka, Ruszcza-Kolonia, Ruszcza-Płaszczyzna, Skrzypaczowice, Skwirzowa, Sulisławice, Suliszów, Świniary Nowe, Świniary Stare, Trzebiesławice, Wnorów, Wojcieszyce, Wólka Gieraszowska and Zawidza.

== Neighbouring gminas ==
Gmina Łoniów is bordered by the city of Tarnobrzeg and by the gminas of Baranów Sandomierski, Klimontów, Koprzywnica and Osiek.
