= Piotrkowice, Kazimierza County =

Piotrkowice
- Village
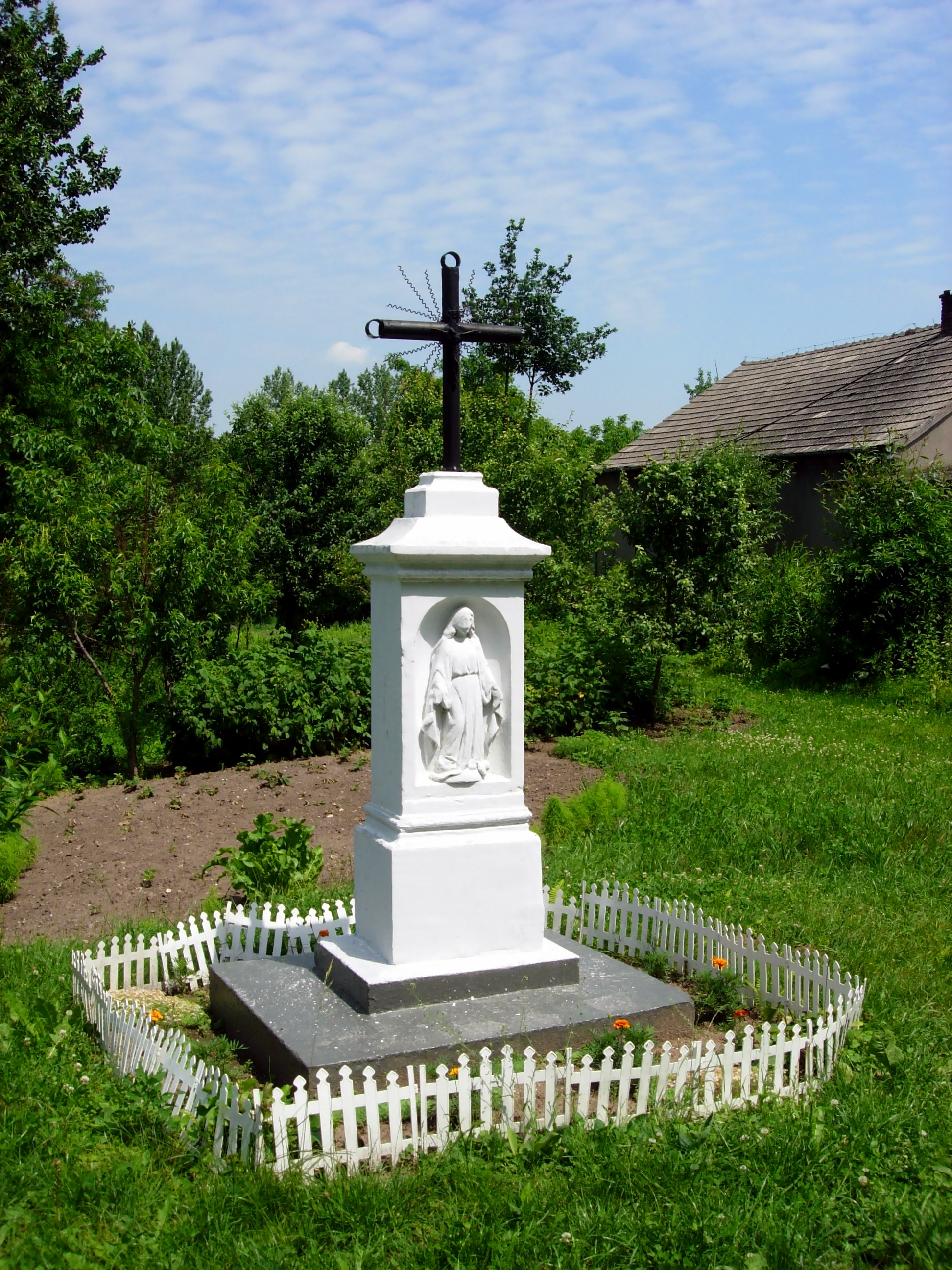
- Roadside cross

- Location within Poland
- Coordinates: 50°14′24″N 20°37′43″E
- Country: Poland
- Voivodeship: Świętokrzyskie
- County: Kazimierza
- Gmina: Bejsce

Piotrkowice [pjɔtrkɔˈvit͡sɛ] is a village in the administrative district of Gmina Bejsce, within Kazimierza County, Świętokrzyskie Voivodeship, in south-central Poland. It lies approximately 2 km (1 mi) south-east of Bejsce, 11 km (7 mi) east of Kazimierza Wielka, and 72 km (45 mi) south of the regional capital Kielce.
