= Cieciorka, Pomeranian Voivodeship =

Village in Pomeranian Voivodeship, Poland

Cieciorka
- Village
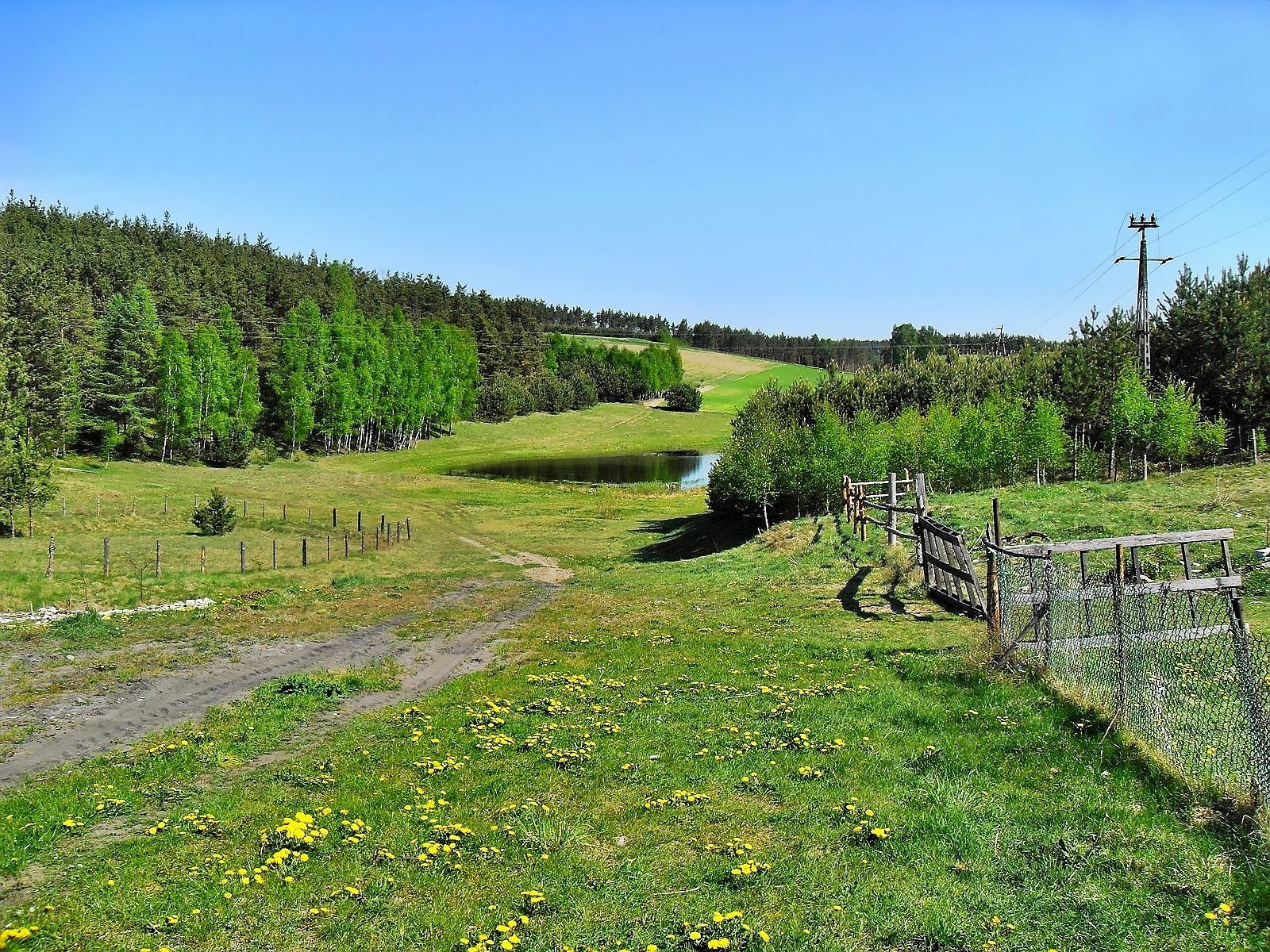

- Location within Poland
- Coordinates: 53°55′49″N 18°12′34″E
- Country: Poland
- Voivodeship: Pomeranian
- County: Starogard
- Gmina: Kaliska
- Highest elevation: 159 m (522 ft)
- Lowest elevation: 140 m (460 ft)

Population
  - Total: 363
- Time zone: UTC+1 (CET)
  - Summer (DST): UTC+2 (CEST)
- Vehicle registration: GST

Cieciorka [t͡ɕɛˈt͡ɕɔrka] is a village in the administrative district of Gmina Kaliska, within Starogard County, Pomeranian Voivodeship, in northern Poland. It is located within the ethnocultural region of Kociewie in the historic region of Pomerania.
