= Leśna Huta =

Village in Pomeranian Voivodeship, Poland

- Settlement
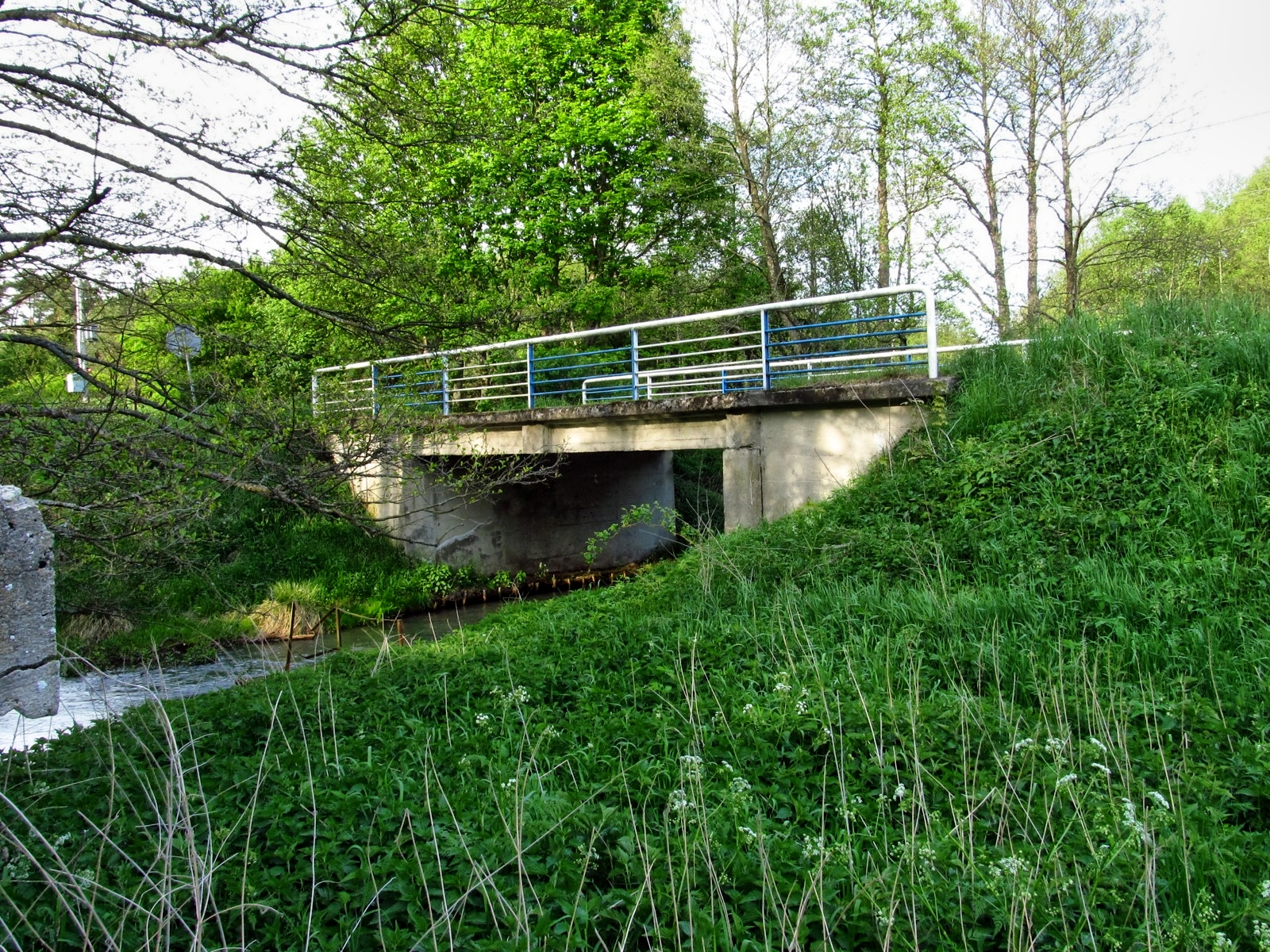
- A bridge over the stream running through the village

- Location within Poland
- Coordinates: 53°53′2″N 18°5′52″E
- Country: Poland
- Voivodeship: Pomeranian
- County: Starogard
- Gmina: Kaliska
- Population: 15
- Time zone: UTC+1 (CET)
  - Summer (DST): UTC+2 (CEST)
- Vehicle registration: GST

Leśna Huta [ˈlɛɕna ˈxuta] is a settlement in the administrative district of Gmina Kaliska, within Starogard County, Pomeranian Voivodeship, in northern Poland. It is located within the ethnocultural region of Kociewie in the historic region of Pomerania.
