= Studzienice, Starogard County =

Village in Pomeranian Voivodeship, Poland

Studzienice
- Village
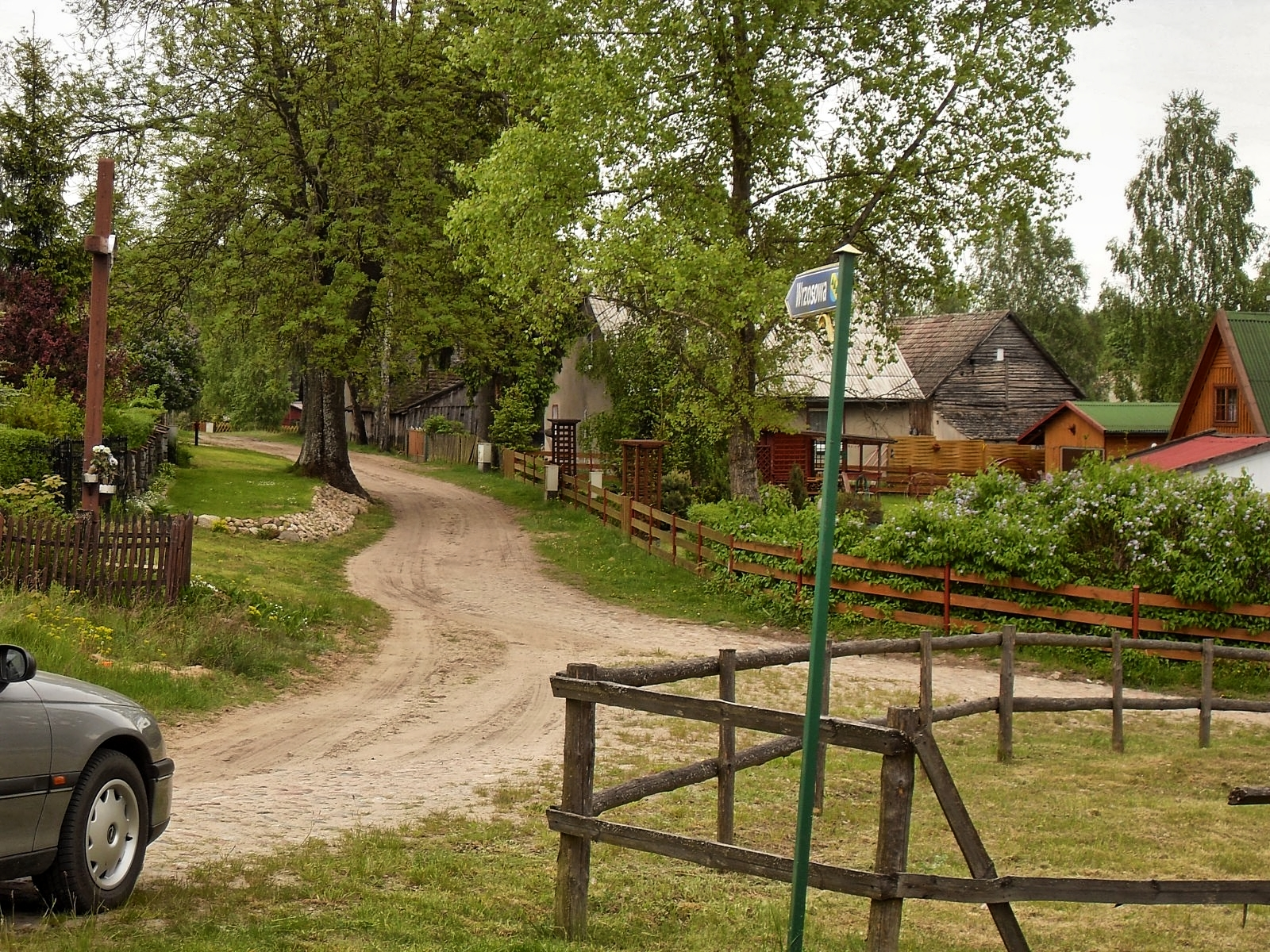

- Location within Poland
- Coordinates: 53°53′32″N 18°5′55″E
- Country: Poland
- Voivodeship: Pomeranian
- County: Starogard
- Gmina: Kaliska

Population
  - Total: 123
- Time zone: UTC+1 (CET)
  - Summer (DST): UTC+2 (CEST)
- Vehicle registration: GST

Studzienice [stud͡ʑɛˈnit͡sɛ] is a village in the administrative district of Gmina Kaliska, within Starogard County, Pomeranian Voivodeship, in northern Poland. It is located in the ethnocultural region of Kociewie in the historic region of Pomerania.
