= Przewłoka, Świętokrzyskie Voivodeship =

Przewłoka
- Village
- Location within Poland
- Coordinates: 50°32′50″N 21°36′47″E
- Country: Poland
- Voivodeship: Świętokrzyskie
- County: Sandomierz
- Gmina: Łoniów

Przewłoka [pʂɛˈvwɔka] is a village in the administrative district of Gmina Łoniów, within Sandomierz County, Świętokrzyskie Voivodeship, in south-central Poland. It lies approximately 7 km (4 mi) east of Łoniów, 18 km (11 mi) south-west of Sandomierz, and 80 km (50 mi) south-east of the regional capital Kielce.
