= Bazów =

- Village
- Location within Poland
- Coordinates: 50°35′40″N 21°26′51″E
- Country: Poland
- Voivodeship: Świętokrzyskie
- County: Sandomierz
- Gmina: Łoniów
- Population: 160

Bazów [ˈbazuf] is a village in the administrative district of Gmina Łoniów, within Sandomierz County, Świętokrzyskie Voivodeship, in south-central Poland. It lies approximately 7 km (4 mi) north-west of Łoniów, 24 km (15 mi) south-west of Sandomierz, and 67 km (42 mi) south-east of the regional capital Kielce.
