= Dąbrowa, Starogard County =

Village in Pomeranian Voivodeship, Poland

Dąbrowa
- Village
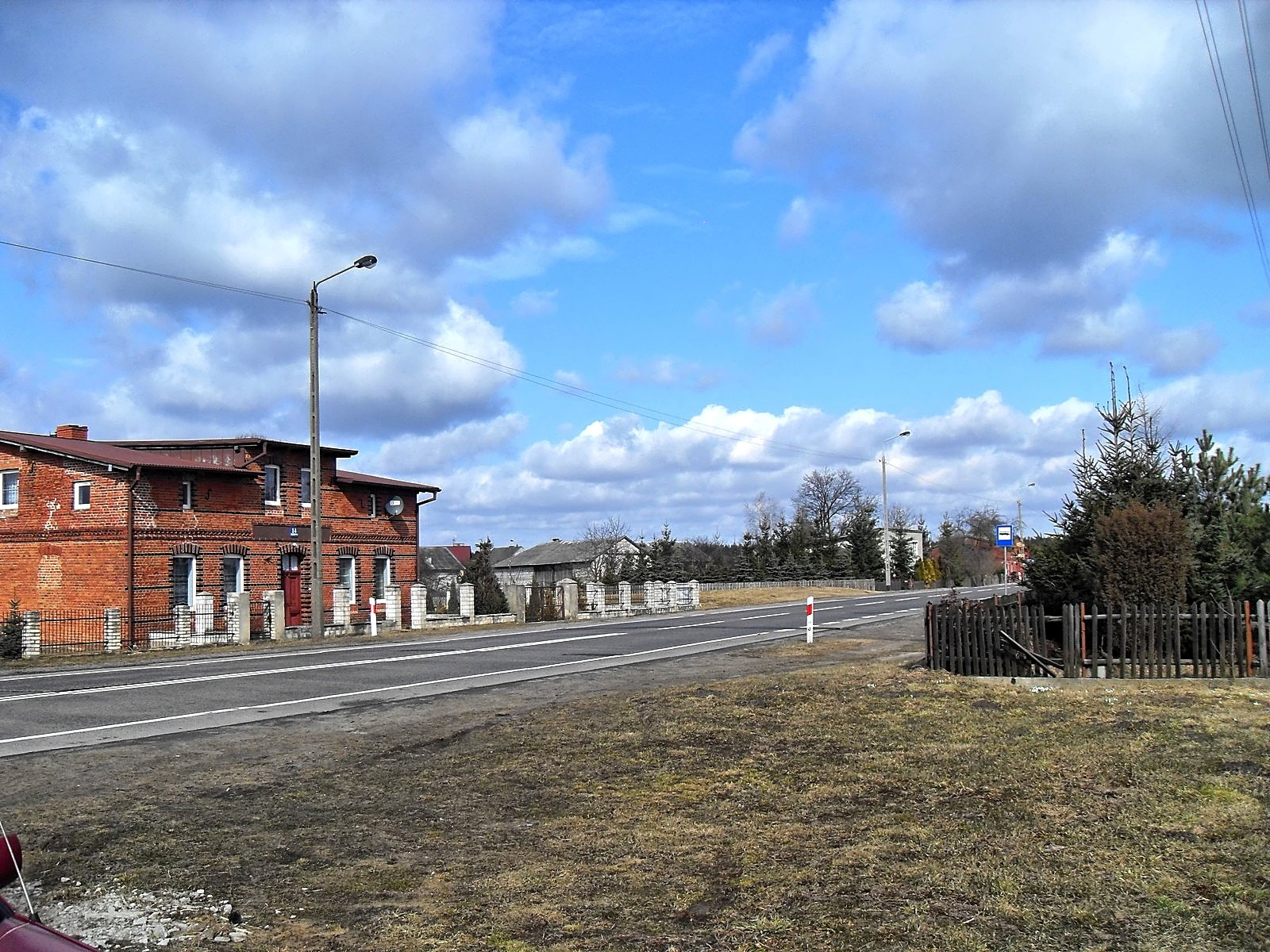
- The village centre

- Location within Poland
- Coordinates: 53°54′15″N 18°14′58″E
- Country: Poland
- Voivodeship: Pomeranian
- County: Starogard
- Gmina: Kaliska
- Population: 198
- Time zone: UTC+1 (CET)
  - Summer (DST): UTC+2 (CEST)
- Vehicle registration: GST

Dąbrowa [dɔmˈbrɔva] is a village in the administrative district of Gmina Kaliska, within Starogard County, Pomeranian Voivodeship, in northern Poland. It is located within the ethnocultural region of Kociewie in the historic region of Pomerania.
