= Bartel Mały =

Village in Pomeranian Voivodeship, Poland

- Settlement
- Location within Poland
- Coordinates: 53°54′36″N 18°8′45″E
- Country: Poland
- Voivodeship: Pomeranian
- County: Starogard
- Gmina: Kaliska

Population
  - Total: 4
- Time zone: UTC+1 (CET)
  - Summer (DST): UTC+2 (CEST)
- Vehicle registration: GST

Bartel Mały [ˈbartɛl ˈmawɨ] is a settlement in the administrative district of Gmina Kaliska, within Starogard County, Pomeranian Voivodeship, in northern Poland. It is located in the ethnocultural region of Kociewie in the historic region of Pomerania.
