= Królewice, Sandomierz County =

Królewice
- Village
- Location within Poland
- Coordinates: 50°36′N 21°26′E
- Country: Poland
- Voivodeship: Świętokrzyskie
- County: Sandomierz
- Gmina: Łoniów
- Population: 121

Królewice [krulɛˈvit͡sɛ] is a village in the administrative district of Gmina Łoniów, within Sandomierz County, Świętokrzyskie Voivodeship, in south-central Poland. It lies approximately 8 km (5 mi) north-west of Łoniów, 25 km (16 mi) south-west of Sandomierz, and 66 km (41 mi) south-east of the regional capital Kielce.
