= Kamienna Karczma =

Village in Pomeranian Voivodeship, Poland

- Settlement
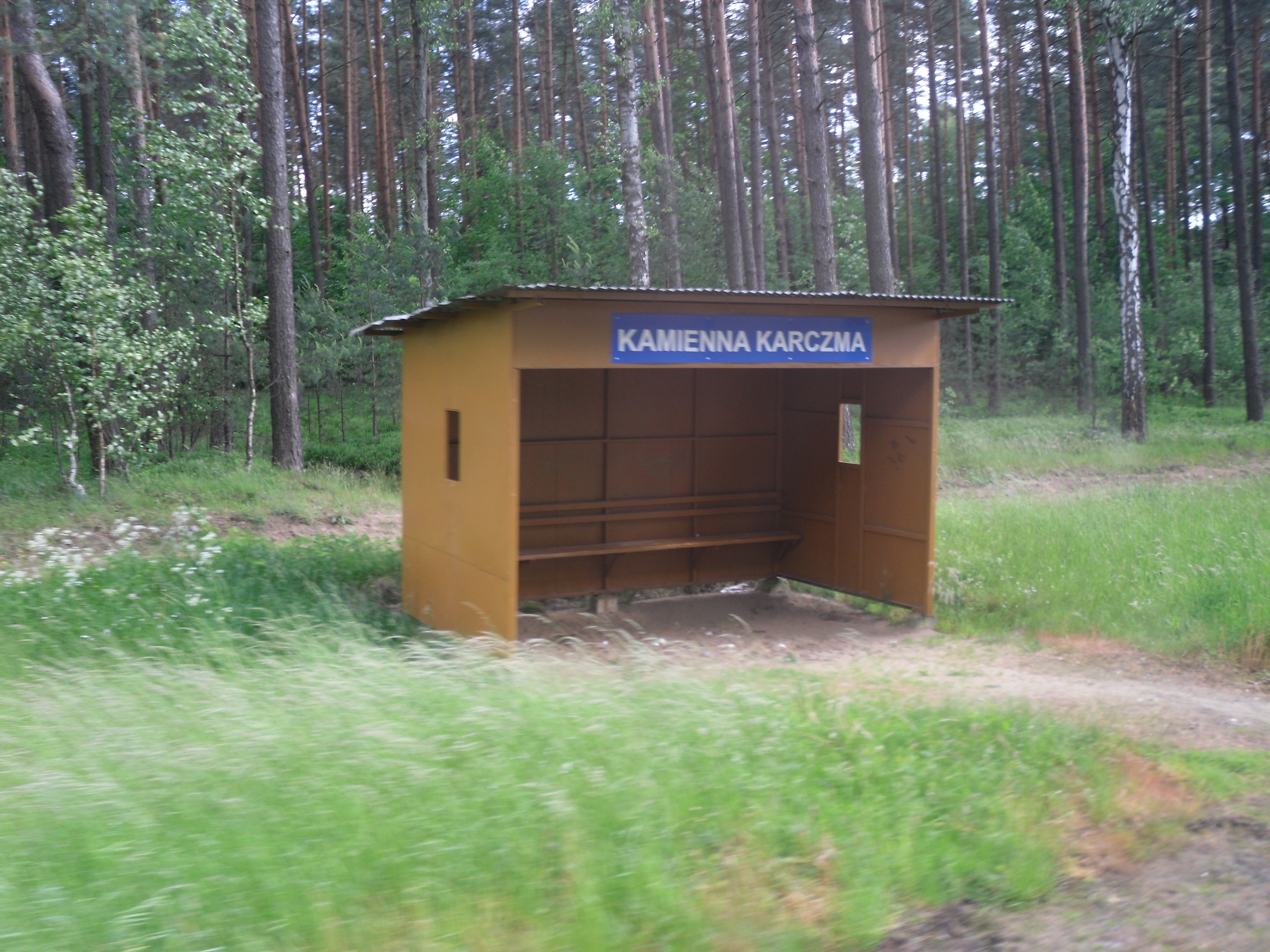
- A waiting room at the village's railway station

- Location within Poland
- Coordinates: 53°52′37″N 18°9′43″E
- Country: Poland
- Voivodeship: Pomeranian
- County: Starogard
- Gmina: Kaliska
- Population: 33
- Time zone: UTC+1 (CET)
  - Summer (DST): UTC+2 (CEST)
- Vehicle registration: GST

Kamienna Karczma [kaˈmjɛnna ˈkart͡ʂma] is a settlement in the administrative district of Gmina Kaliska, within Starogard County, Pomeranian Voivodeship, in northern Poland. It is located within the ethnocultural region of Kociewie in the historic region of Pomerania.
