= Okoninki =

Village in Pomeranian Voivodeship, Poland

- Settlement
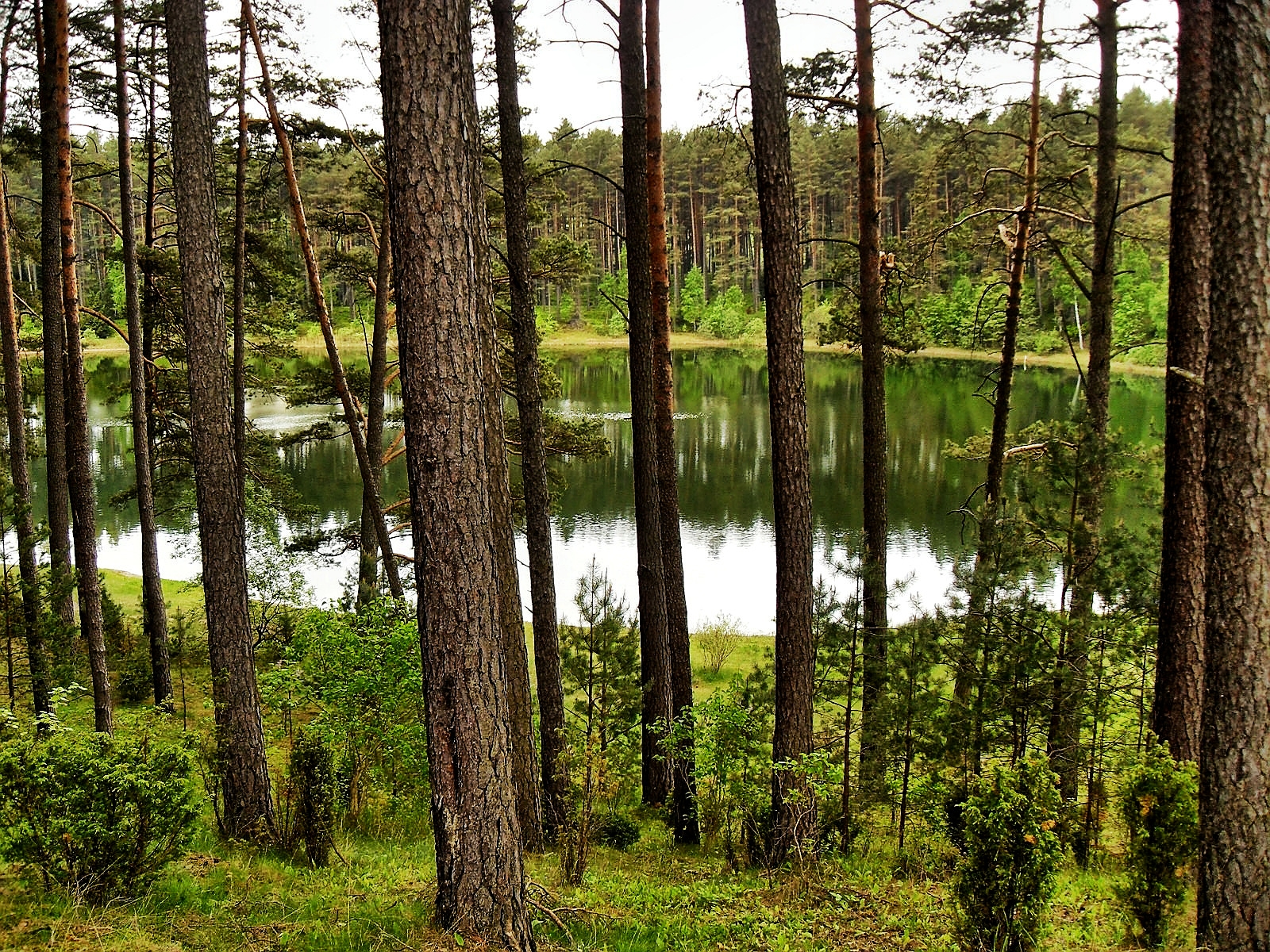
- View of a lake in the village

- Location within Poland
- Coordinates: 53°56′52″N 18°10′59″E
- Country: Poland
- Voivodeship: Pomeranian
- County: Starogard
- Gmina: Kaliska
- Population: 39
- Time zone: UTC+1 (CET)
  - Summer (DST): UTC+2 (CEST)
- Vehicle registration: GST

Okoninki [ɔkɔˈninki] is a settlement in the administrative district of Gmina Kaliska, within Starogard County, Pomeranian Voivodeship, in northern Poland. It is located within the ethnocultural region of Kociewie in the historic region of Pomerania.
