= Brończyce, Świętokrzyskie Voivodeship =

Brończyce
- Village
- Location within Poland
- Coordinates: 50°13′13″N 20°35′54″E
- Country: Poland
- Voivodeship: Świętokrzyskie
- County: Kazimierza
- Gmina: Bejsce

Brończyce [brɔɲˈt͡ʂɨt͡sɛ] is a village in the administrative district of Gmina Bejsce, within Kazimierza County, Świętokrzyskie Voivodeship, in south-central Poland. In 1975–1998 it was owned by Keltse
