= Płociczno, Pomeranian Voivodeship =

Village in Pomeranian Voivodeship, Poland

Płociczno
- Village
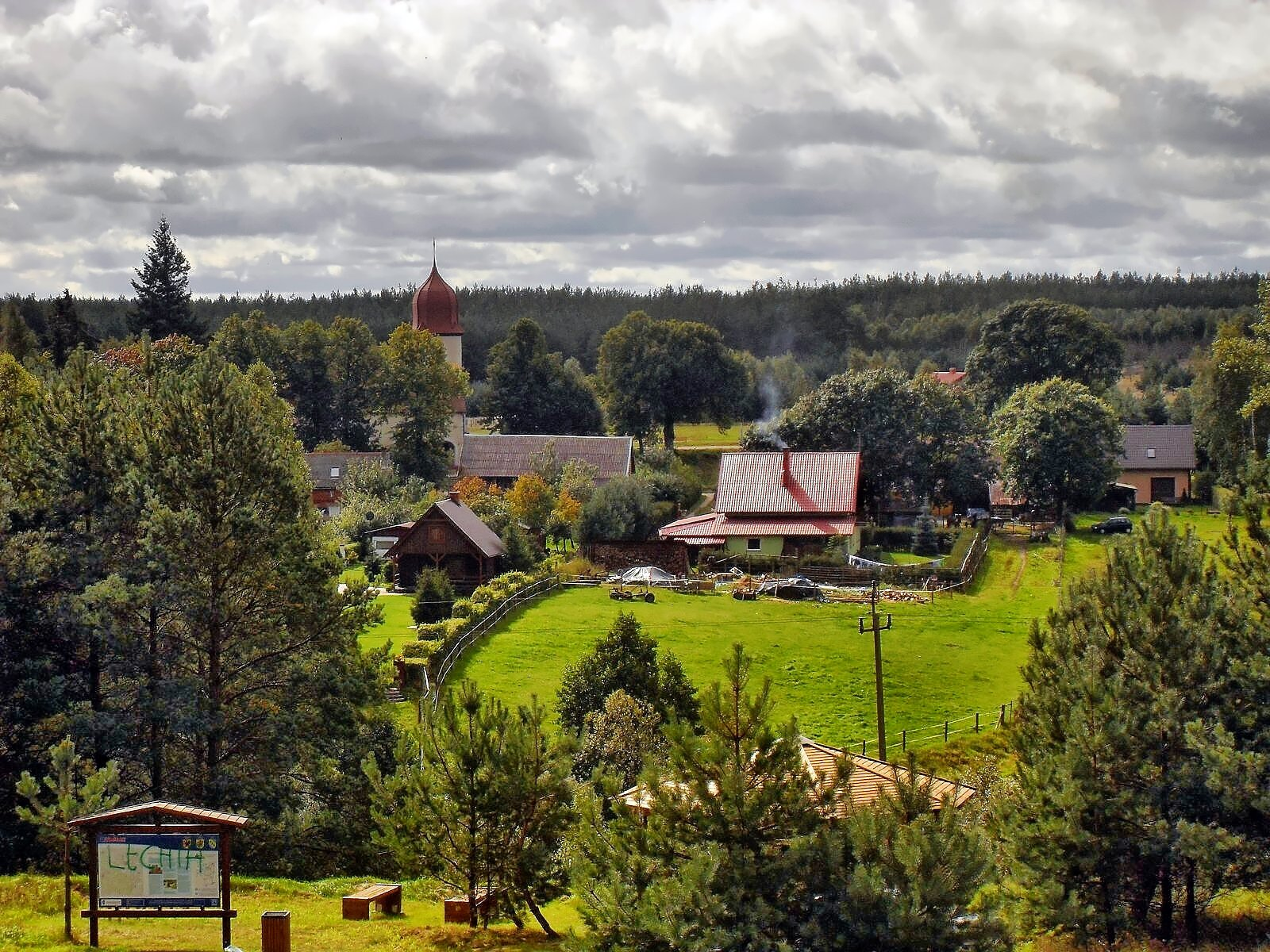
- A view of the village from the hill

- Location within Poland
- Coordinates: 53°56′29″N 18°11′37″E
- Country: Poland
- Voivodeship: Pomeranian
- County: Starogard
- Gmina: Kaliska
- Population: 58
- Time zone: UTC+1 (CET)
  - Summer (DST): UTC+2 (CEST)
- Vehicle registration: GST

Płociczno [pwɔˈt͡ɕit͡ʂnɔ] is a village in the administrative district of Gmina Kaliska, within Starogard County, Pomeranian Voivodeship, in northern Poland. It is located in the ethnocultural region of Kociewie in the historic region of Pomerania.
