= Elongation =

Elongation may refer to:

- Elongation (astronomy)
- Elongation (geometry)
- Elongation (plasma physics)
- Part of transcription of DNA into RNA of all types, including mRNA, tRNA, rRNA, etc.
- Part of translation (biology) of mRNA into proteins
- Elongated organisms
- Elongation (mechanics), linear deformation
