= Stritch =

Stritch may refer to:

- Stritch (saxophone), musical instrument
- Samuel Stritch (1887–1958), American cardinal in the Roman Catholic Church
  - Cardinal Stritch High School, Oregon, Ohio, named after him
  - Cardinal Stritch University, Milwaukee, Wisconsin, named after him
  - Stritch School of Medicine, Loyola University, Chicago, USA, named after him
- Elaine Stritch (1926–2014), American actress and singer, niece of Cardinal Samuel Stritch
- Stritch (surname), Surname of Irish and English origin

== See also ==
- Stretch (disambiguation)
