= Iwiczno =

Village in Pomeranian Voivodeship, Poland

- Village
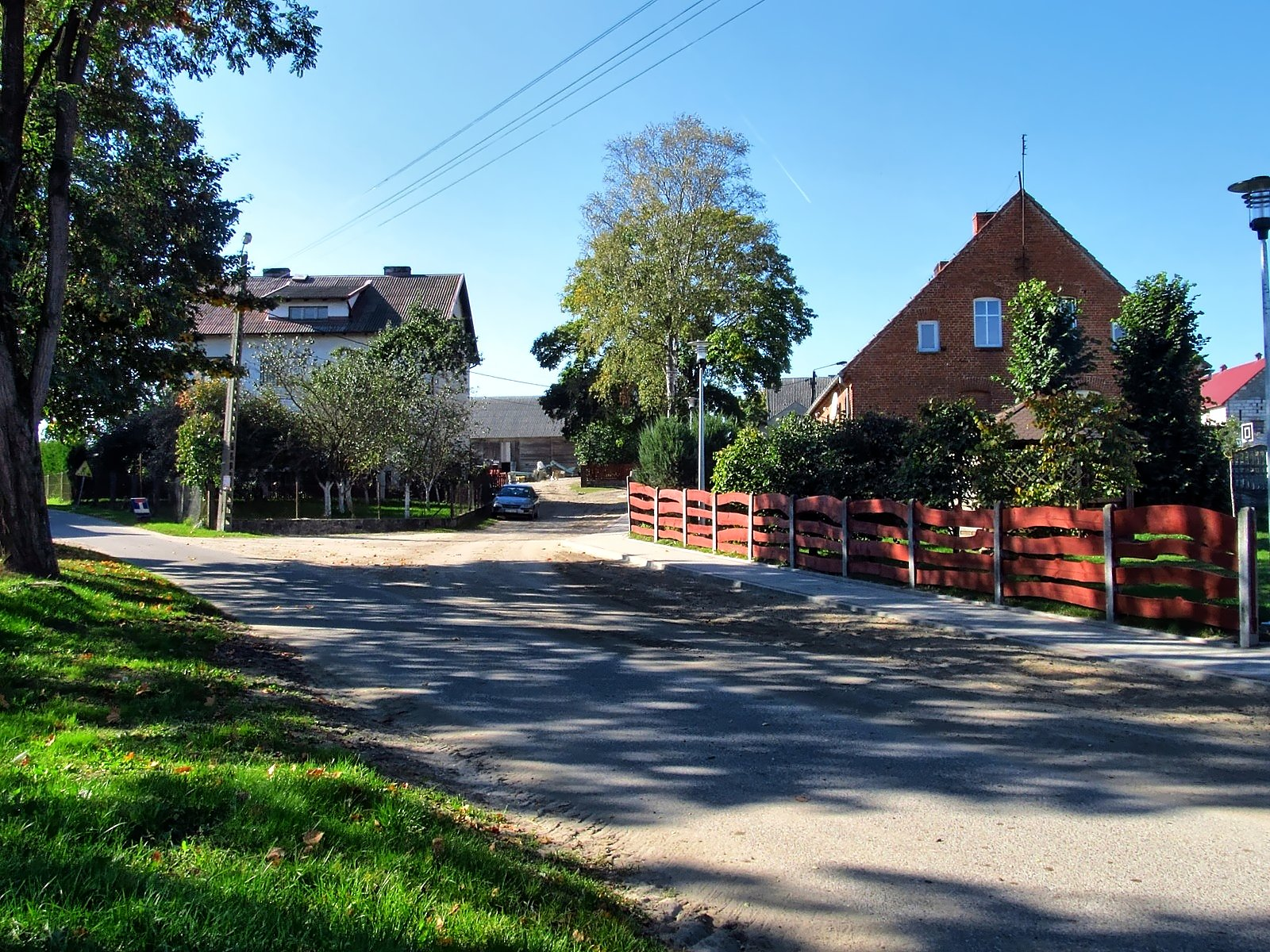
- A street in Iwiczno

- Location within Poland
- Coordinates: 53°53′11″N 18°14′22″E
- Country: Poland
- Voivodeship: Pomeranian
- County: Starogard
- Gmina: Kaliska
- Highest elevation: 141 m (463 ft)
- Lowest elevation: 110 m (360 ft)
- Population: 254
- Time zone: UTC+1 (CET)
  - Summer (DST): UTC+2 (CEST)
- Vehicle registration: GST

Iwiczno [iˈvit͡ʂnɔ] is a village in the administrative district of Gmina Kaliska, within Starogard County, Pomeranian Voivodeship, in northern Poland. It is located within the ethnocultural region of Kociewie in the historic region of Pomerania.

Iwiczno was a royal village of the Polish Crown, administratively located in the Tczew County in the Pomeranian Voivodeship.

== Notable people ==
- Izydor Gulgowski (1874–1925), Polish journalist and ethnographer, Kashubian poet, officer of the Polish Army, founder of the Kashubian Ethnographic Park in Wdzydze Kiszewskie
