= Czarne, Gmina Kaliska =

Village in Pomeranian Voivodeship, Poland

Czarne
- Village
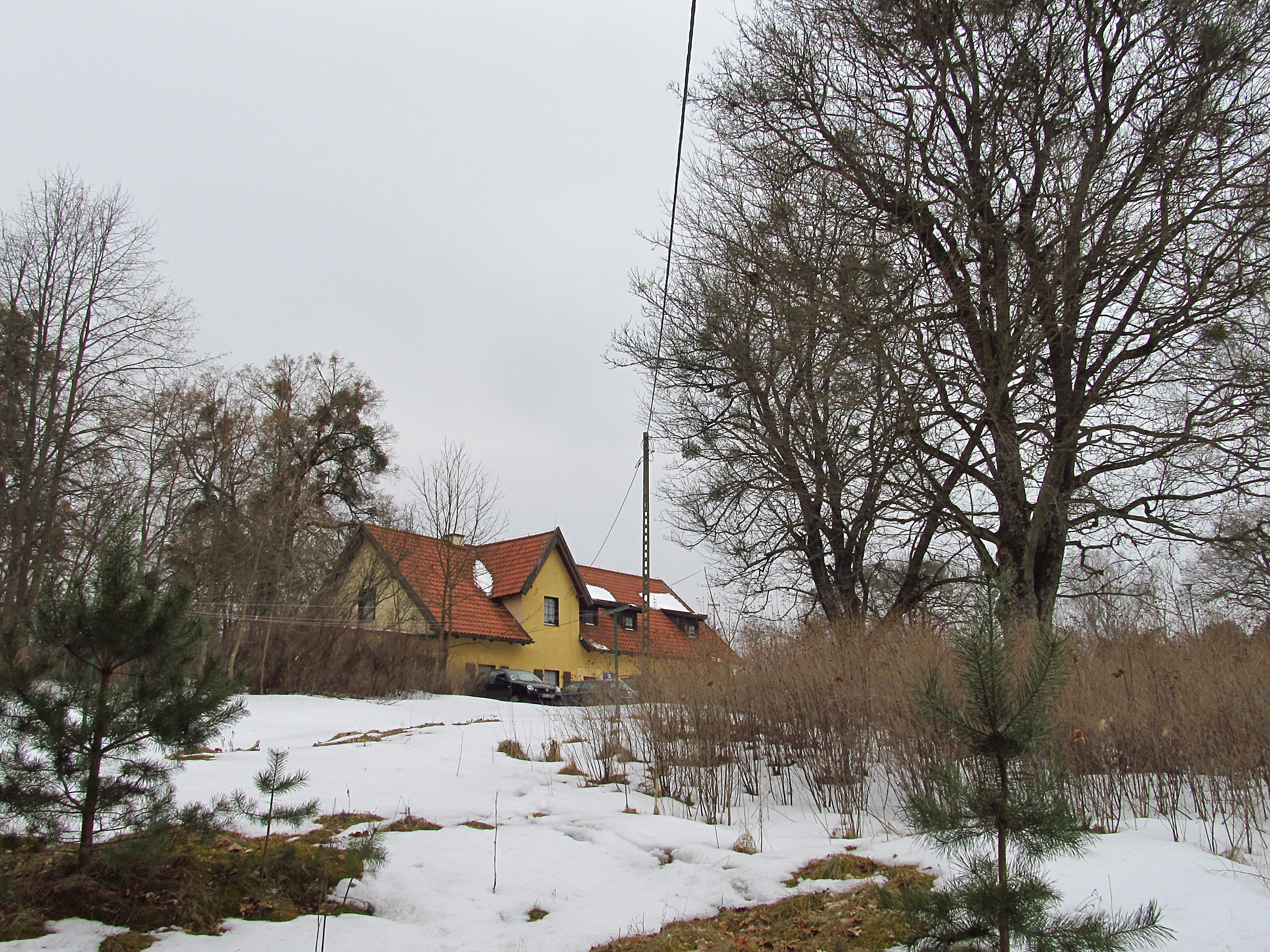

- Location within Poland
- Coordinates: 53°51′37″N 18°14′3″E
- Country: Poland
- Voivodeship: Pomeranian
- County: Starogard
- Gmina: Kaliska

Population
  - Total: 99
- Time zone: UTC+1 (CET)
  - Summer (DST): UTC+2 (CEST)
- Vehicle registration: GST

Czarne [ˈt͡ʂarnɛ] is a village in the administrative district of Gmina Kaliska, within Starogard County, Pomeranian Voivodeship, in northern Poland. It is located within the ethnocultural region of Kociewie in the historic region of Pomerania.
