= Strych, Pomeranian Voivodeship =

Village in Pomeranian Voivodeship, Poland

Strych
- Village
- Location within Poland
- Coordinates: 53°55′3″N 18°14′47″E
- Country: Poland
- Voivodeship: Pomeranian
- County: Starogard
- Gmina: Kaliska
- Time zone: UTC+1 (CET)
  - Summer (DST): UTC+2 (CEST)
- Vehicle registration: GST

Strych [strɨx] is a village in the administrative district of Gmina Kaliska, within Starogard County, Pomeranian Voivodeship, in northern Poland. It is located in the ethnocultural region of Kociewie in the historic region of Pomerania.
