= Czech units of measurement =

Units of measurement used in Czechia

A number of locally-specific units of measurement were used in the Czech lands to measure length, area, capacity and so on. In 1876, the metric system was made compulsory; however, local measurements and old Viennese measurements weren't still in use.

== Local units during the first half of the 20th century ==
=== Length ===
1 látro was equal to 1.917 m.

==== Bohemia ====
There were units specific to Bohemia.

1 stopa ( or střevíc) = 0.296 m

1 sáh = 1.778 m

1 míle = 7.003 km.

==== Prague ====
In Prague, one loket was equal to 0.593 m. The stopa was equal to 0.2965 m.

==== Moravia ====
As in Bohemia and Prague, there were specific local units used in Moravia.

1 stopa (or střevíc) = 0.284 m

1 loket = 0.594 m.

==== Silesia ====
Similar to the other three parts of the country, local measurements were in use in Silesia.

1 loket = 0.579 m

1 míle = 6.483 km

1 stopa = 0.2895 m.

=== Area ===
==== Bohemia ====
In Bohemia, one měřice was equal to 1999 m^{2}. 1 korec (also known as the strych or the míra) was equal to 2878 m^{2}.

1 jitro = 2 korec

1 lán = 60 korec.

=== Capacity ===
Several different units were used to measure capacity. One Moravian měřice was equal to 70.6 L. One korec (or one strych) was equal to 93.592 L.
