= John Stretch =

John Stretch may refer to:

- Jack Stretch, bishop
- John Stretch (MP) for Devon (UK Parliament constituency)
