= Łążek, Pomeranian Voivodeship =

Village in Pomeranian Voivodeship, Poland

Łążek
- Village
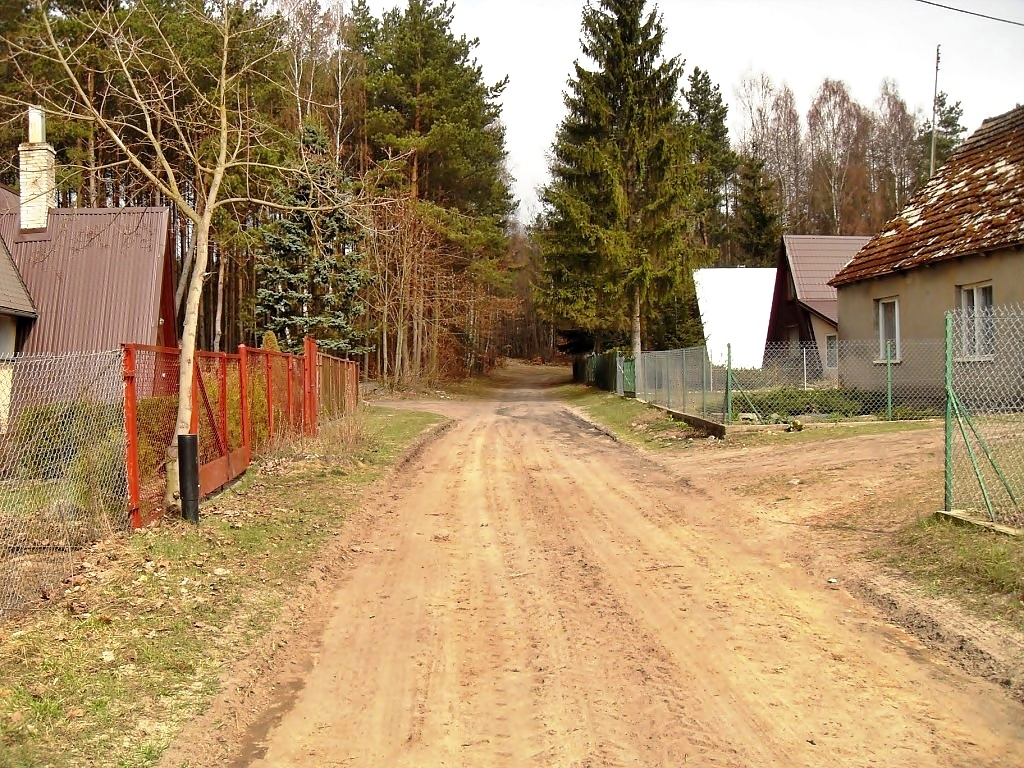

- Location within Poland
- Coordinates: 53°53′47″N 18°16′24″E
- Country: Poland
- Voivodeship: Pomeranian
- County: Starogard
- Gmina: Kaliska
- Population: 32
- Time zone: UTC+1 (CET)
  - Summer (DST): UTC+2 (CEST)
- Vehicle registration: GST

Łążek [ˈwɔ̃ʐɛk] is a village located in the administrative district of Gmina Kaliska, within Starogard County, Pomeranian Voivodeship, in northern Poland. It is located within the ethnocultural region of Kociewie in the historic region of Pomerania.
