= Stritch (surname) =

Surname list

Deriving from the Old English word for street, Stritch is a surname of Irish and English origin with close historical ties to the city of Limerick, where the Stritches were a family of merchants and politicians, the name appearing more than fifty times in lists of mayors and bailiffs between 1377 and 1650. The family name is also numerous in County Longford.

== People with this surname ==
- Billy Stritch (born 1962), American composer, arranger, vocalist, and jazz pianist
- Elaine Stritch (1926–2014), American actress and singer, best known for her work on Broadway
- Samuel Stritch (1887–1958), American cardinal in the Roman Catholic Church
