= Bejsce =

- Village
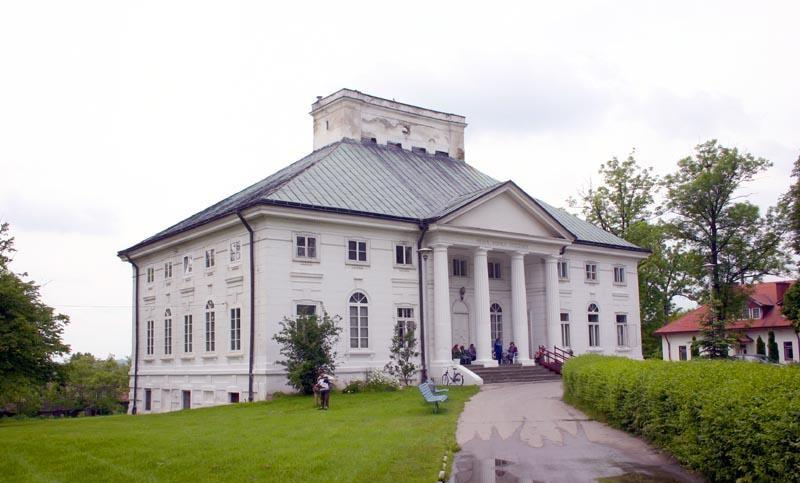
- Palace in Bejsce

- Coat of arms

- Location within Poland
- Coordinates: 50°15′N 20°37′E
- Country: Poland
- Voivodeship: Świętokrzyskie
- County: Kazimierza
- Gmina: Bejsce

Bejsce [ˈbɛi̯st͡sɛ] is a village in Kazimierza County, Świętokrzyskie Voivodeship, in south-central Poland. It is the seat of the gmina (administrative district) called Gmina Bejsce. It lies about 10 km (6 mi) east of Kazimierza Wielka and 71 km (44 mi) south of the regional capital Kielce.

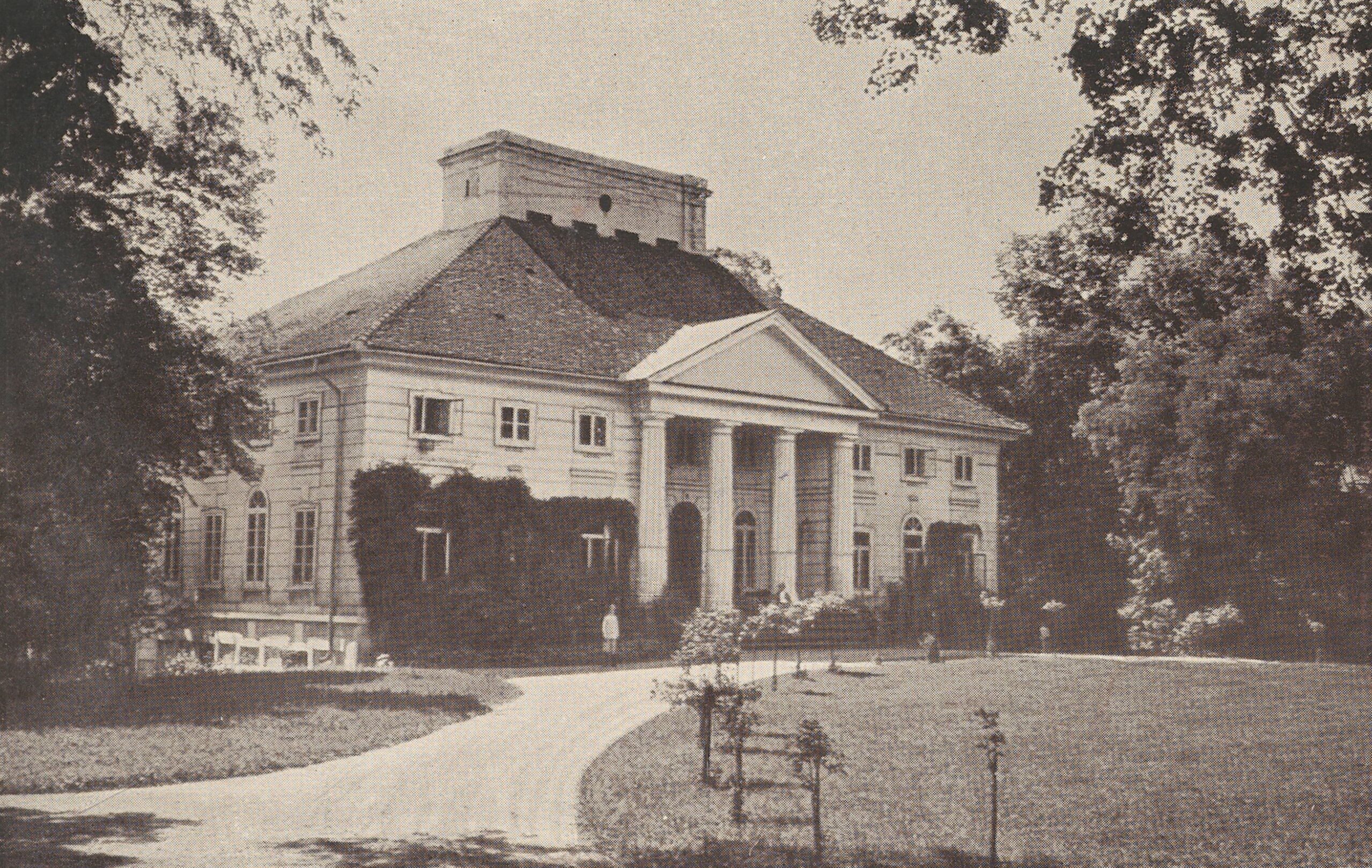
Palace before 1911

Bejsce belongs to Lesser Poland, and has a long history, which dates back to the early years of the Kingdom of Poland. In the 10th century, a defensive gord probably existed here, with a chapel, which later was expanded into a church. First mention of Bejsce comes from the year 1063, in a document by Bishop Lambert of Kraków. In 1190, the new church was blessed by another bishop of Kraków, Fulko. The St. Nicholas church was funded in 1340 by a local nobleman, Ostasz Firlej. Throughout the centuries, the church was remodelled and expanded several times. Its oldest part consists of a presbytery with a sacristy. A late Renaissance-style chapel was added circa 1600. In the presbytery, there are fragments of Gothic polychrome, which present Byblical scenes. The 1600 chapel was built as a tomb for Voivode of Kraków Mikołaj Firlej and his wife Elżbieta née Ligęza. It was modelled after Wawel’s Sigismund's Chapel, and the Bejsce chapel is regarded as one of the finest examples of Renaissance chapels in Poland.

Apart from St. Nicholas church and chapel, Bejsce has a neoclassical palace, built in 1802 by architect Jakub Kubicki for Marcin Badeni, Minister of Justice in the Governments of the Duchy of Warsaw and Congress Poland. The palace has been used as a senior citizen house for a period of time.
