= Łoniów =

- Village
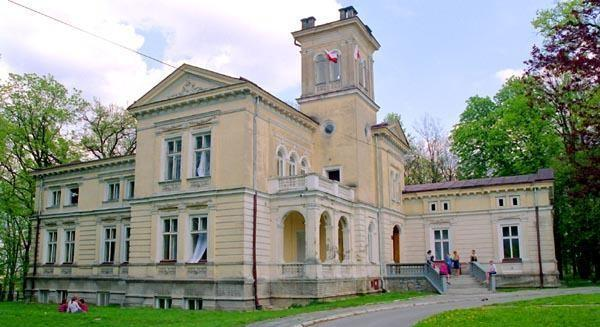

- Coat of arms

- Location within Poland
- Coordinates: 50°33′50″N 21°31′27″E
- Country: Poland
- Voivodeship: Świętokrzyskie
- County: Sandomierz
- Gmina: Łoniów
- Population: 450

Łoniów [ˈwɔɲuf] is a village in Sandomierz County, Świętokrzyskie Voivodeship, in south-central Poland. It is the seat of the gmina (administrative district) called Gmina Łoniów. It lies approximately 21 km (13 mi) south-west of Sandomierz and 74 km (46 mi) south-east of the regional capital Kielce.
