= Zawadowski =

Zawadowski (feminine: Zawadowska) is a Polish-language surname. It may be the surname of a noble family bearing the Rawa coat of arms. It may originate from one of the location named Zawadów. The Russianized form is Zavadovsky. Notable people with this surname include:

- Elżbieta Zawadowska-Kittel (born 1983), Polish writer, screenwriter and translator
- Wacław Zawadowski (1891–1982), Polish painter
- Witold Zawadowski (1888–1980), Polish physician
- Zygmunt Zawadowski (1899-1978), lawyer, consular officer and diplomat, Minister of Foreign Affairs in the Polish Government in Exile
