= Ławy =

Ławy may refer to the following places:

- Ławy, Kuyavian-Pomeranian Voivodeship (north-central Poland)
- Ławy, Łódź Voivodeship (central Poland)
- Ławy, Świętokrzyskie Voivodeship (south-central Poland)
- Ławy, Łosice County in Masovian Voivodeship (east-central Poland)
- Ławy, Ostrołęka County in Masovian Voivodeship (east-central Poland)
- Ławy, Warsaw West County in Masovian Voivodeship (east-central Poland)
- Ławy, West Pomeranian Voivodeship (north-west Poland)
