= Kamienna, Świętokrzyskie Voivodeship =

Kamienna
- Village
- Location within Poland
- Coordinates: 50°18′13″N 20°38′43″E
- Country: Poland
- Voivodeship: Świętokrzyskie
- County: Kazimierza
- Gmina: Opatowiec

Kamienna [kaˈmjɛnna] is a village in the administrative district of Gmina Opatowiec, within Kazimierza County, Świętokrzyskie Voivodeship, in south-central Poland. It lies approximately 10 km (6 mi) north-west of Opatowiec, 12 km (7 mi) east of Kazimierza Wielka, and 65 km (40 mi) south of the regional capital Kielce.
