= Senisławice =

- Village
- Location within Poland
- Coordinates: 50°16′N 20°45′E
- Country: Poland
- Voivodeship: Świętokrzyskie
- County: Kazimierza
- Gmina: Opatowiec

Senisławice [sɛniswaˈvit͡sɛ] is a village in the administrative district of Gmina Opatowiec, within Kazimierza County, Świętokrzyskie Voivodeship, in south-central Poland. It lies approximately 5 km (3 mi) north-east of Opatowiec, 19 km (12 mi) east of Kazimierza Wielka, and 70 km (43 mi) south of the regional capital Kielce.
