= Korczew =

Korczew may refer to the following places:

- Korczew, Bełchatów County in Łódź Voivodeship (central Poland)
- Korczew, Zduńska Wola County in Łódź Voivodeship (central Poland)
- Korczew, Masovian Voivodeship (east-central Poland)
- Gmina Korczew, a rural gmina whose seat is Korczew, Masovian Voivodeship
