= Wyszogród, Świętokrzyskie Voivodeship =

Wyszogród
- Village
- Location within Poland
- Coordinates: 50°13′12″N 20°41′18″E
- Country: Poland
- Voivodeship: Świętokrzyskie
- County: Kazimierza
- Gmina: Opatowiec

Wyszogród [vɨˈʂɔɡrut] is a village in the administrative district of Gmina Opatowiec, within Kazimierza County, Świętokrzyskie Voivodeship, in south-central Poland. It lies approximately 3 km (2 mi) south-west of Opatowiec, 16 km (10 mi) east of Kazimierza Wielka, and 74 km (46 mi) south of the regional capital Kielce. As of 2011, the village had 37 males and 32 females, for a total population of 69 people.
