= Zavadovsky =

Zavadovsky (feminine: Zavadovskaya) is a Russian-language surname, a Russianized for of the Polish surname Zawadowski, originate from one of the location named Zawadów. An An alternative spelling is Zavadovskiy. Notable people with this surname include:

- Boris Zavadovsky (1895-1951), Russian physiologist
- Gennady Zavadovsky, an alleged dead Soviet cosmonaut
- Ivan Zavadovsky, second in command of the sloop-of-war Vostok in the First Russian Antarctic Expedition, the namesake of two islands
- Pyotr Zavadovsky (1739–1812), Cossack and Russian Imperial official, favourite of Catherine the Great
- Vera Zavadovskaya, Russian courtier, maid of honour to empress Catherine the Great

== See also ==
- Zavadovskiy Island
- Zavodovski Island
