= Kraśniów =

- Village
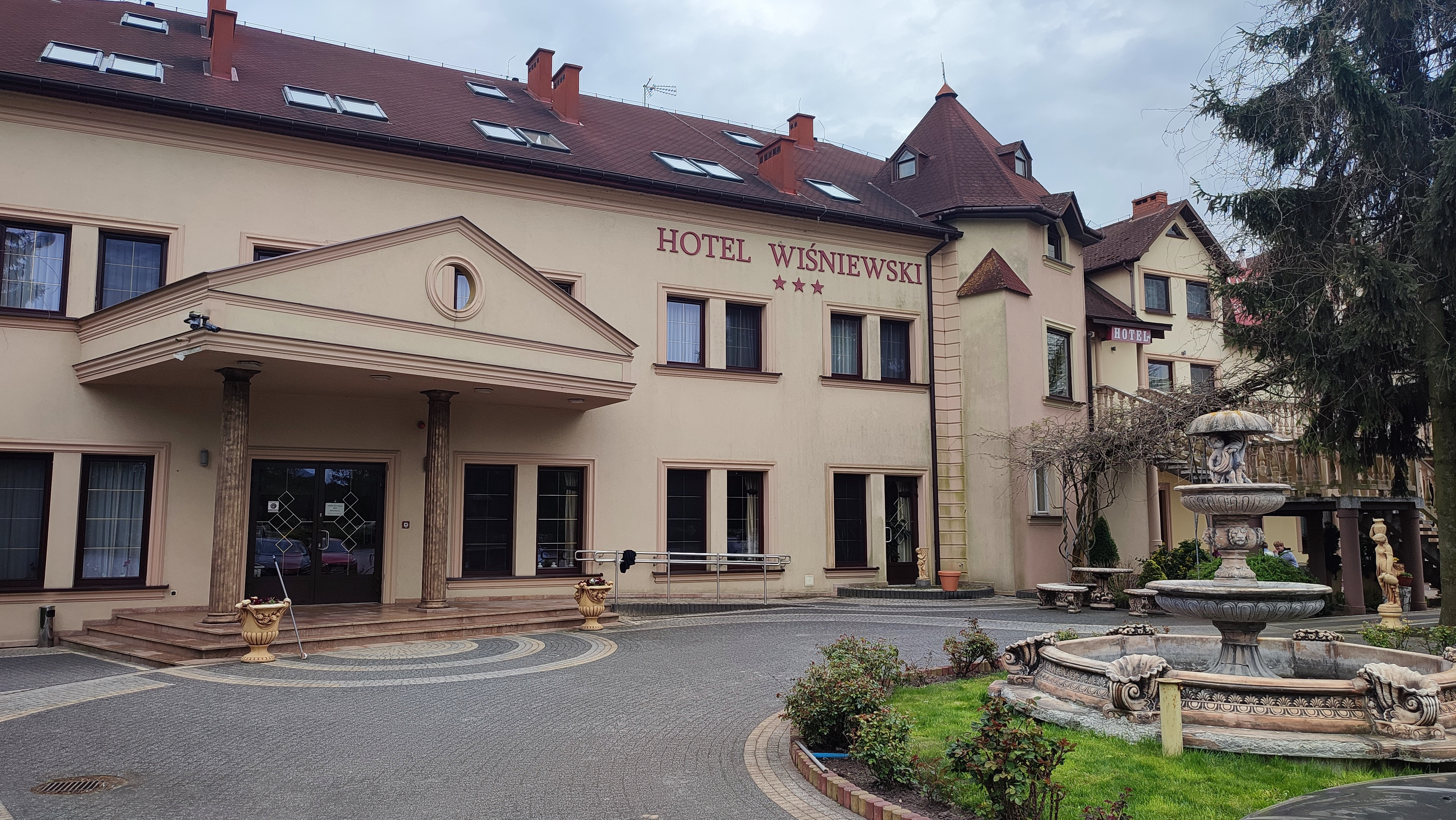

- Location within Poland
- Coordinates: 50°16′N 20°44′E
- Country: Poland
- Voivodeship: Świętokrzyskie
- County: Kazimierza
- Gmina: Opatowiec
- Population (2011): 49

Kraśniów [ˈkraɕɲuf] is a village in the administrative district of Gmina Opatowiec, within Kazimierza County, Świętokrzyskie Voivodeship, in south-central Poland. It lies approximately 4 km (2 mi) north of Opatowiec, 18 km (11 mi) east of Kazimierza Wielka, and 69 km (43 mi) south of the regional capital Kielce.

== Notable people ==
- Paulo Dybala, Argentine footballer, through his paternal grandfather.
