= Wielopole =

Wielopole may refer to:

- Polish name for Vělopolí in the Czech Republic
- Wielopole, Łódź Voivodeship (central Poland)
- Wielopole, Dąbrowa County in Lesser Poland Voivodeship (south Poland)
- Wielopole, Nowy Sącz County in Lesser Poland Voivodeship (south Poland)
- Wielopole, Greater Poland Voivodeship (west-central Poland)
- Wielopole, West Pomeranian Voivodeship (north-west Poland)
- Wielopole, Tarnobrzeg
- Wielopole, Rybnik in Silesian Voivodeship (south Poland)

== See also ==
- Mier Barracks, a building in Warsaw, Poland, sometimes alternatively referred to as the Wielopole Barracks
