= Krzczonów, Świętokrzyskie Voivodeship =

Krzczonów
- Village
- Location within Poland
- Coordinates: 50°17′N 20°38′E
- Country: Poland
- Voivodeship: Świętokrzyskie
- County: Kazimierza
- Gmina: Opatowiec

Krzczonów [ˈkʂt͡ʂɔnuf] is a village in the administrative district of Gmina Opatowiec, within Kazimierza County, Świętokrzyskie Voivodeship, in south-central Poland. It lies approximately 9 km (6 mi) north-west of Opatowiec, 11 km (7 mi) east of Kazimierza Wielka, and 67 km (42 mi) south of the regional capital Kielce.
