= Kobiela, Świętokrzyskie Voivodeship =

Kobiela
- Village
- Location within Poland
- Coordinates: 50°14′36″N 20°41′8″E
- Country: Poland
- Voivodeship: Świętokrzyskie
- County: Kazimierza
- Gmina: Opatowiec

Kobiela [kɔˈbjɛla] is a village in the administrative district of Gmina Opatowiec, within Kazimierza County, Świętokrzyskie Voivodeship, in south-central Poland. It lies approximately 3 km (2 mi) north-west of Opatowiec, 15 km (9 mi) east of Kazimierza Wielka, and 72 km (45 mi) south of the regional capital Kielce.
