= Kęsów =

- Village
- Location within Poland
- Coordinates: 50°15′N 20°40′E
- Country: Poland
- Voivodeship: Świętokrzyskie
- County: Kazimierza
- Gmina: Opatowiec

Kęsów [ˈkɛ̃suf] is a village in the administrative district of Gmina Opatowiec, within Kazimierza County, Świętokrzyskie Voivodeship, in south-central Poland. It lies approximately 5 km (3 mi) north-west of Opatowiec, 14 km (9 mi) east of Kazimierza Wielka, and 71 km (44 mi) south of the regional capital Kielce.
