= Mazury (disambiguation) =

Mazury, or Masuria, is a region in north Poland.

Mazury may also refer to:

- Mazury (horse), a breed of horse
- Mazury, Greater Poland Voivodeship, a village in west-central Poland
- Mazury, Łódź Voivodeship, a village in central Poland
- Mazury, Podlaskie Voivodeship, a village in north-east Poland
- Mazury, Silesian Voivodeship, a village in south Poland
- Mazury, Subcarpathian Voivodeship (a.k.a. Podkarpackie Voivodeship), a village in south-east Poland
- Mazury, Warmian-Masurian Voivodeship, a village in north Poland

== See also ==
- SS Masuren, a cargo ship in service 1935–64
- ORP Mazur, ships of the Polish Navy
