= Dobiecin =

Dobiecin may refer to the following places:

- Dobiecin, Łódź Voivodeship (central Poland)
- Dobiecin, Gmina Chynów in Masovian Voivodeship (east-central Poland)
- Dobiecin, Gmina Mogielnica in Masovian Voivodeship (east-central Poland)
