= Urzuty, Świętokrzyskie Voivodeship =

Urzuty
- Village
- Location within Poland
- Coordinates: 50°12′45″N 20°40′3″E
- Country: Poland
- Voivodeship: Świętokrzyskie
- County: Kazimierza
- Gmina: Opatowiec

Urzuty [uˈʐutɨ] is a village in the administrative district of Gmina Opatowiec, within Kazimierza County, Świętokrzyskie Voivodeship, in south-central Poland. It lies approximately 5 km (3 mi) south-west of Opatowiec, 15 km (9 mi) south-east of Kazimierza Wielka, and 75 km (47 mi) south of the regional capital Kielce.
