= Trębaczów =

Trębaczów may refer to the following places:

- Trębaczów, Greater Poland Voivodeship (west-central Poland)
- Trębaczów, Lublin Voivodeship (east Poland)
- Trębaczów, Świętokrzyskie Voivodeship (south-central Poland)
