= Augustynów =

Augustynów may refer to the following places:

- Augustynów, Bełchatów County in Łódź Voivodeship (central Poland)
- Augustynów, Sieradz County in Łódź Voivodeship (central Poland)
- Augustynów, Wieruszów County in Łódź Voivodeship (central Poland)
- Augustynów, Koło County in Greater Poland Voivodeship (west-central Poland)
- Augustynów, Słupca County in Greater Poland Voivodeship (west-central Poland)
