= Ksany =

- Village
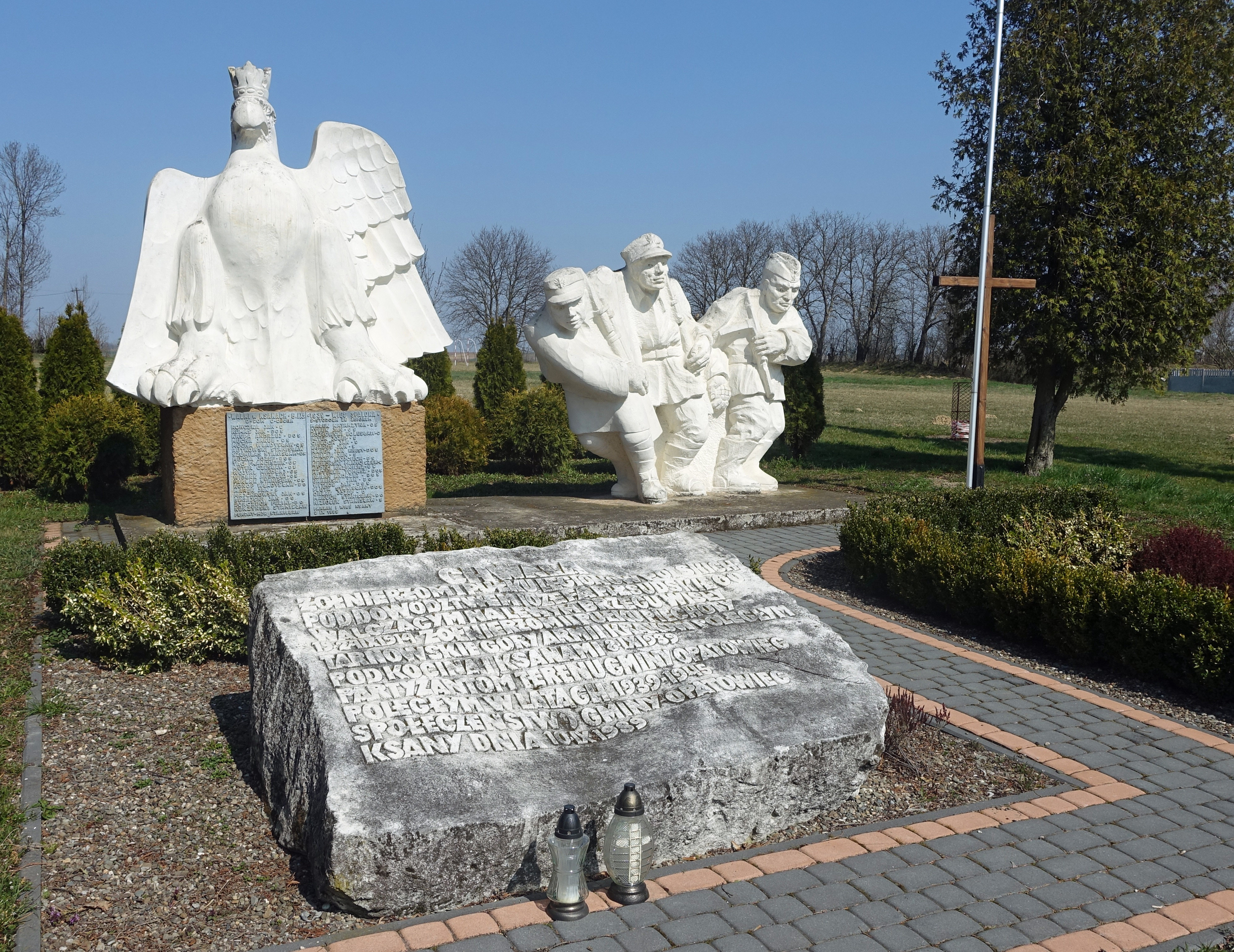

- Location within Poland
- Coordinates: 50°16′26″N 20°42′20″E
- Country: Poland
- Voivodeship: Świętokrzyskie
- County: Kazimierza
- Gmina: Opatowiec

Ksany [ˈksanɨ] is a village, in the administrative district of Gmina Opatowiec, within Kazimierza County, Świętokrzyskie Voivodeship, in south-central Poland. It lies approximately 5 km (3 mi) north of Opatowiec, 16 km (10 mi) east of Kazimierza Wielka, and 68 km (42 mi) south of the regional capital Kielce.
