= Kocina, Świętokrzyskie Voivodeship =

Kocina
- Village
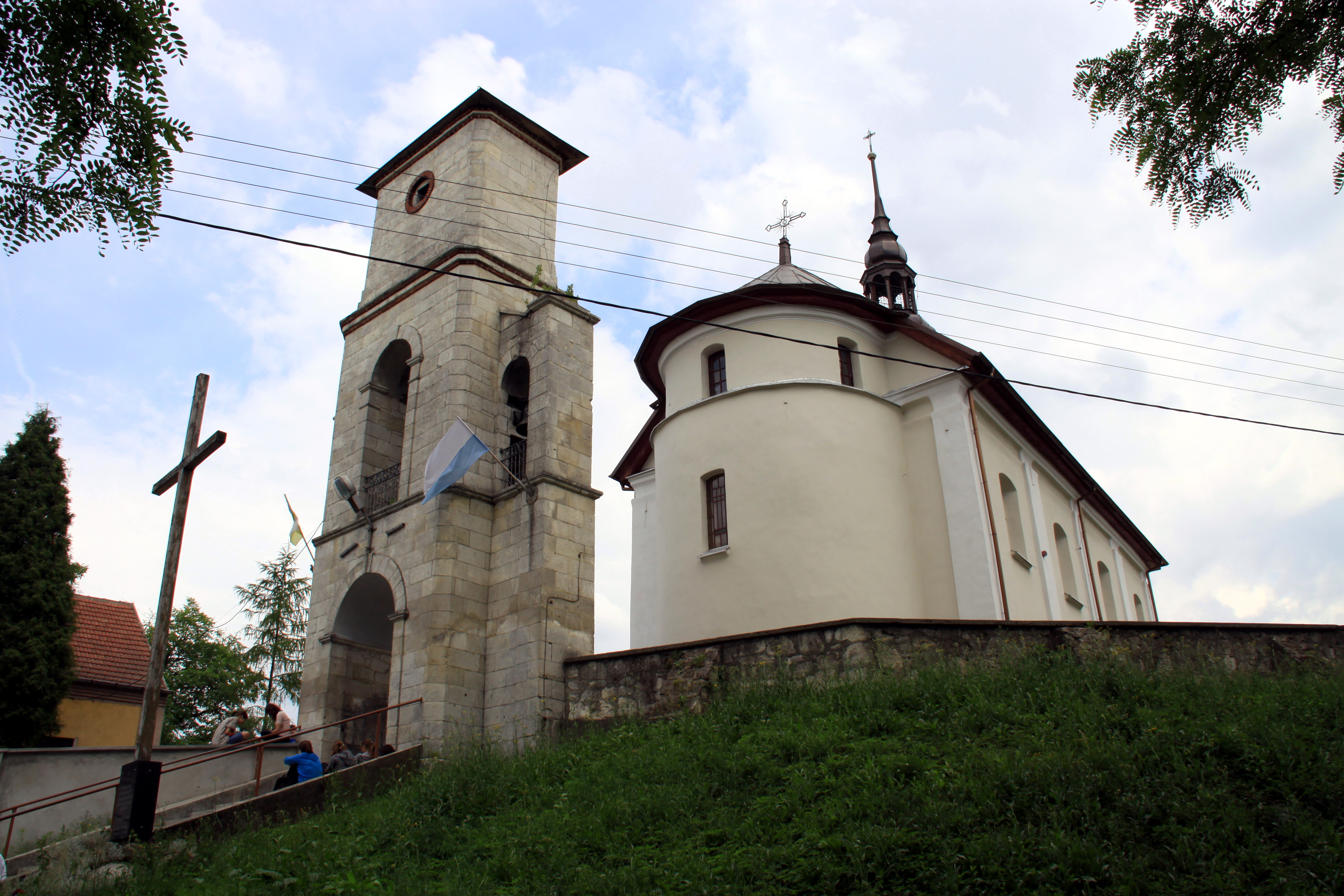
- Saint Barbara church

- Location within Poland
- Coordinates: 50°17′48″N 20°40′44″E
- Country: Poland
- Voivodeship: Świętokrzyskie
- County: Kazimierza
- Gmina: Opatowiec

Kocina [kɔˈt͡ɕina] is a village in the administrative district of Gmina Opatowiec, within Kazimierza County, Świętokrzyskie Voivodeship, in south-central Poland. It lies approximately 8 km (5 mi) north of Opatowiec, 15 km (9 mi) east of Kazimierza Wielka, and 66 km (41 mi) south of the regional capital Kielce.

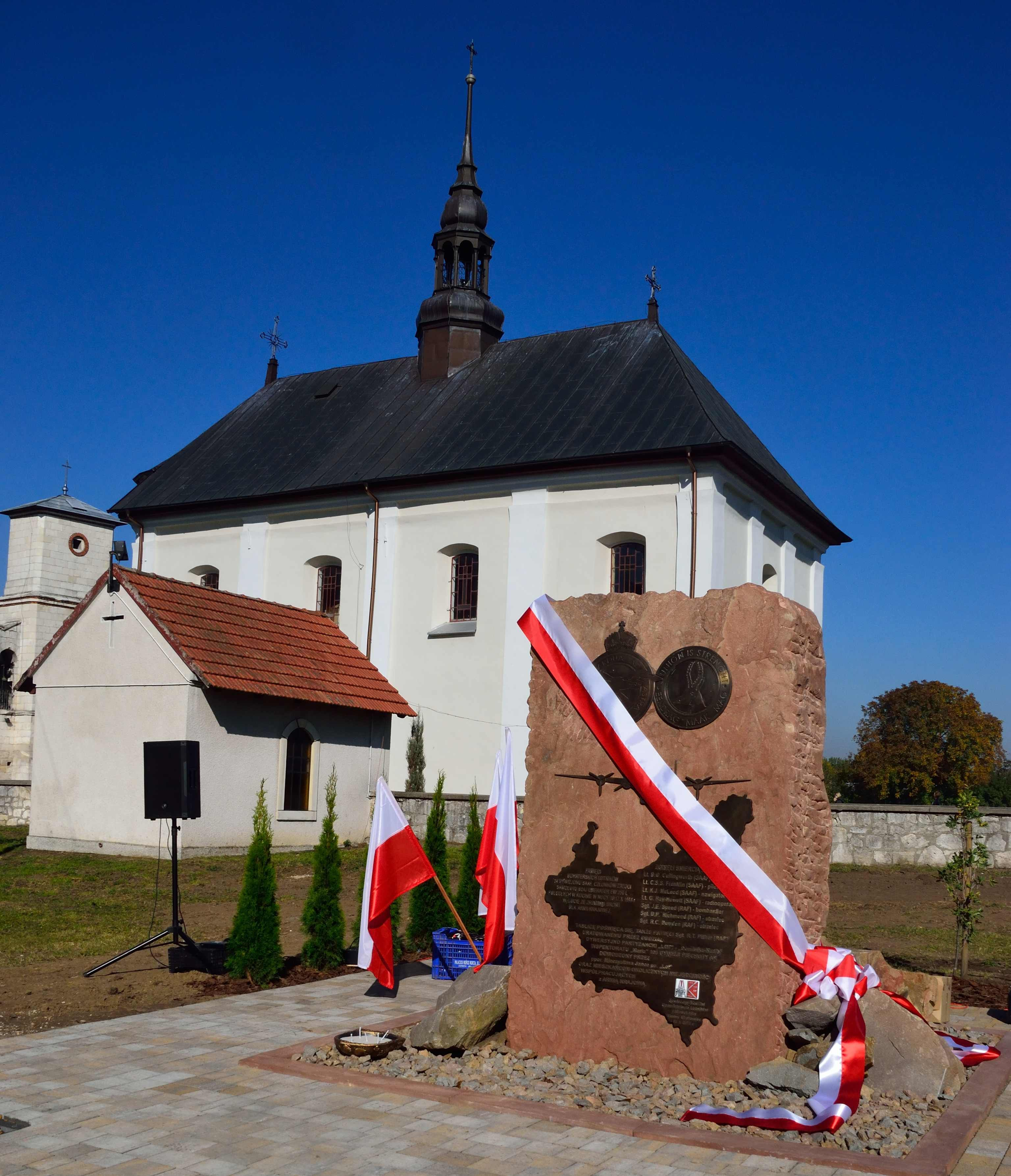
The South African Air Force Memorial in Kocina
