= Olesnik =

Olesnik may refer to:

- Olešník, a municipality and village in the Czech Republic
- Oleśnik, Łódź Voivodeship, a village in central Poland
- Oleśnik, Masovian Voivodeship, a village in east-central Poland
