= Chrustowice =

- Village
- Location within Poland
- Coordinates: 50°15′N 20°42′E
- Country: Poland
- Voivodeship: Świętokrzyskie
- County: Kazimierza
- Gmina: Opatowiec

Chrustowice [xrustɔˈvit͡sɛ] is a village in the administrative district of Gmina Opatowiec, within Kazimierza County, Świętokrzyskie Voivodeship, in south-central Poland. It lies about 3 km (2 mi) north-west of Opatowiec, 16 km (10 mi) east of Kazimierza Wielka, and 71 km (44 mi) south of the regional capital Kielce.
