= Kałduny =

Kałduny may refer to the following villages in Poland:

- Kałduny, Łódź Voivodeship
- Kałduny, Warmian-Masurian Voivodeship

Kalduny refers to dumplings in Belarusian and other Slavic cuisines.
