= Rzemienowice =

- Village
- Location within Poland
- Coordinates: 50°16′N 20°40′E
- Country: Poland
- Voivodeship: Świętokrzyskie
- County: Kazimierza
- Gmina: Opatowiec

Rzemienowice [ʐɛmjɛnɔˈvit͡sɛ] is a village in the administrative district of Gmina Opatowiec, within Kazimierza County, Świętokrzyskie Voivodeship, in south-central Poland. It lies approximately 6 km (4 mi) north-west of Opatowiec, 13 km (8 mi) east of Kazimierza Wielka, and 69 km (43 mi) south of the regional capital Kielce.
