= Mistrzowice =

- Village
- Location within Poland
- Coordinates: 50°15′26″N 20°40′1″E
- Country: Poland
- Voivodeship: Świętokrzyskie
- County: Kazimierza
- Gmina: Opatowiec
- Population (approx.): 80

Mistrzowice [mistʂɔˈvit͡sɛ] is a village in the administrative district of Gmina Opatowiec, located within Kazimierza County, Świętokrzyskie Voivodeship, in south-central Poland. It is situated approximately 5 km (3 mi) northwest of Opatowiec, 14 km (9 mi) east of Kazimierza Wielka, and 70 km (43 mi) south of the regional capital Kielce.
