= Rogów, Kazimierza County =

Rogów
- Village
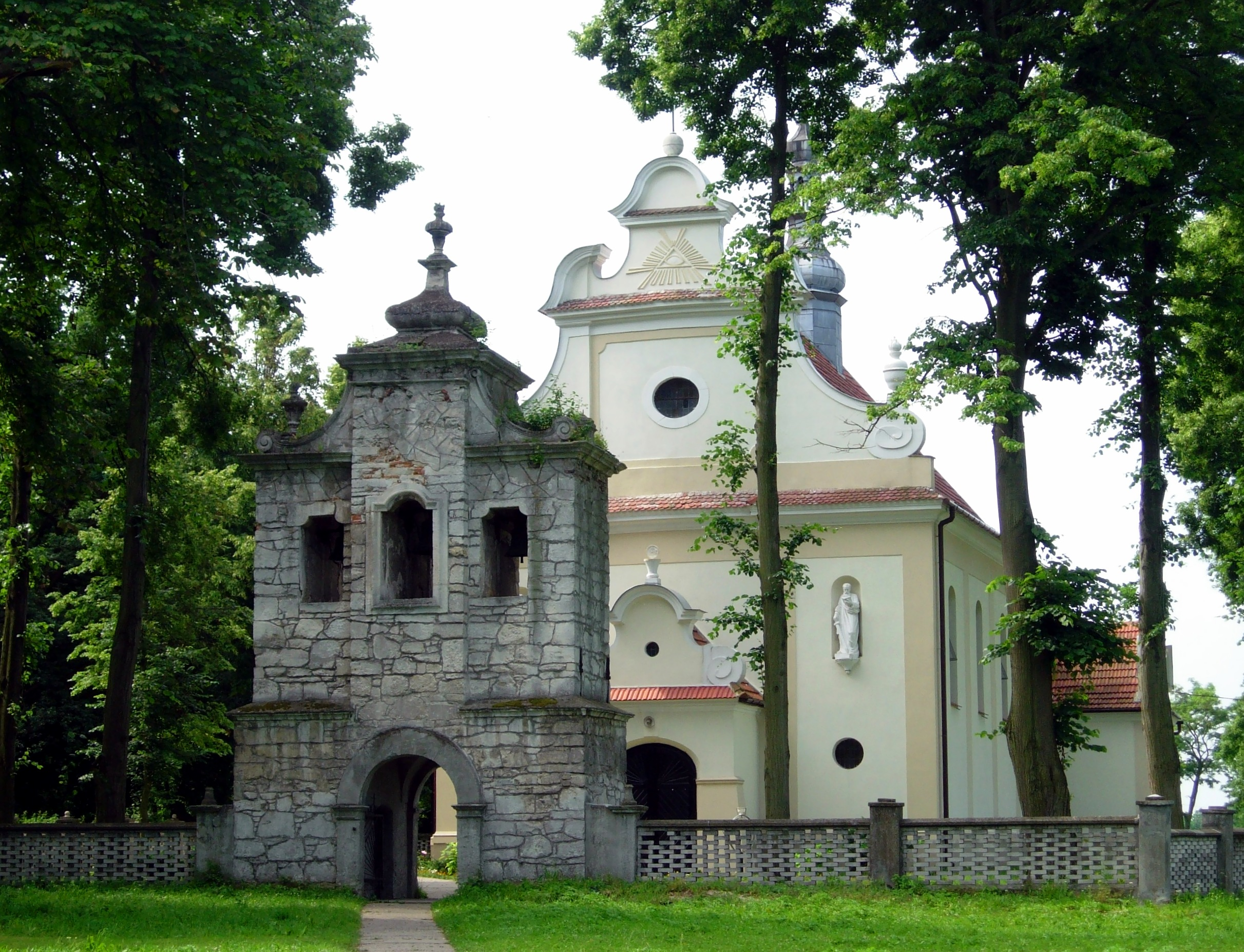
- Church of the Visitation of the Virgin Mary

- Location within Poland
- Coordinates: 50°13′N 20°42′E
- Country: Poland
- Voivodeship: Świętokrzyskie
- County: Kazimierza
- Gmina: Opatowiec

Rogów [ˈrɔɡuf] is a village in the administrative district of Gmina Opatowiec, within Kazimierza County, Świętokrzyskie Voivodeship, in south-central Poland. It lies approximately 3 km (2 mi) south-west of Opatowiec, 17 km (11 mi) east of Kazimierza Wielka, and 75 km (47 mi) south of the regional capital Kielce.

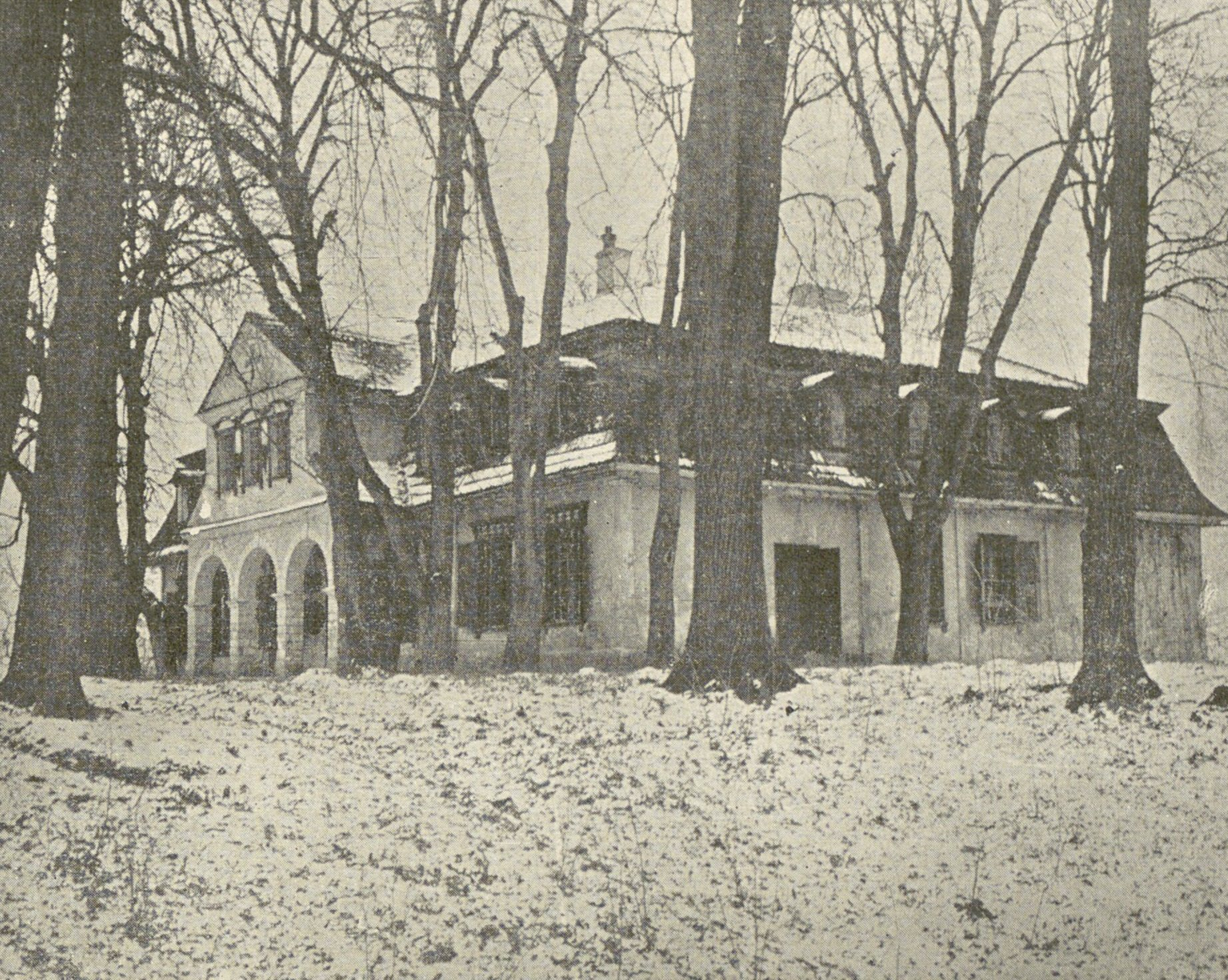
Manor house in Rogów ca 1918

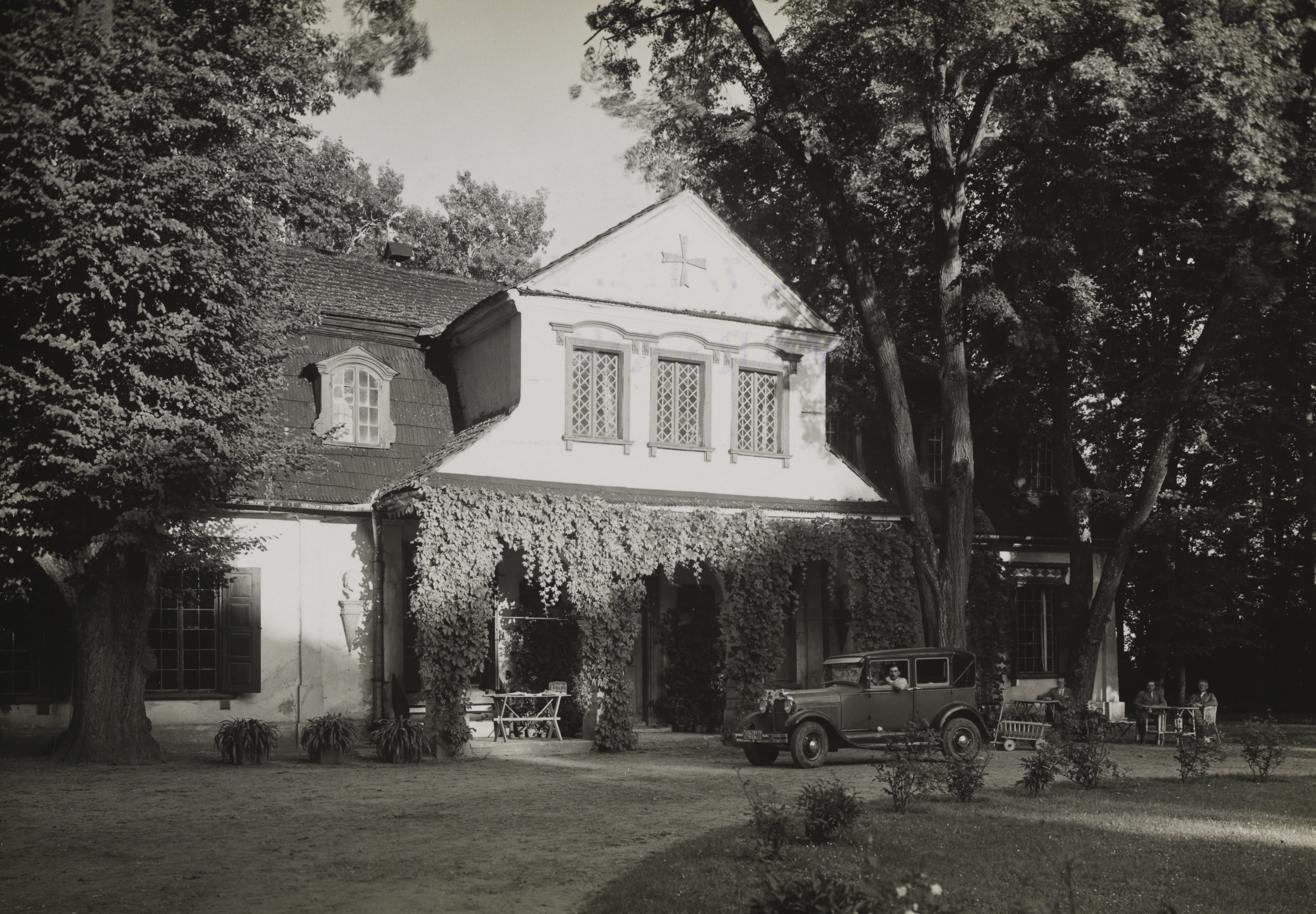
Manor house in Rogów ca 1936
