= Zwierzchów =

- Village
- Location within Poland
- Coordinates: 51°22′6″N 19°27′26″E
- Country: Poland
- Voivodeship: Łódź
- County: Bełchatów
- Gmina: Bełchatów
- Population: 160

Zwierzchów [ˈzvʲɛʂxuf] is a village in the administrative district of Gmina Bełchatów, within Bełchatów County, Łódź Voivodeship, in central Poland.
