= Postękalice =

- Village
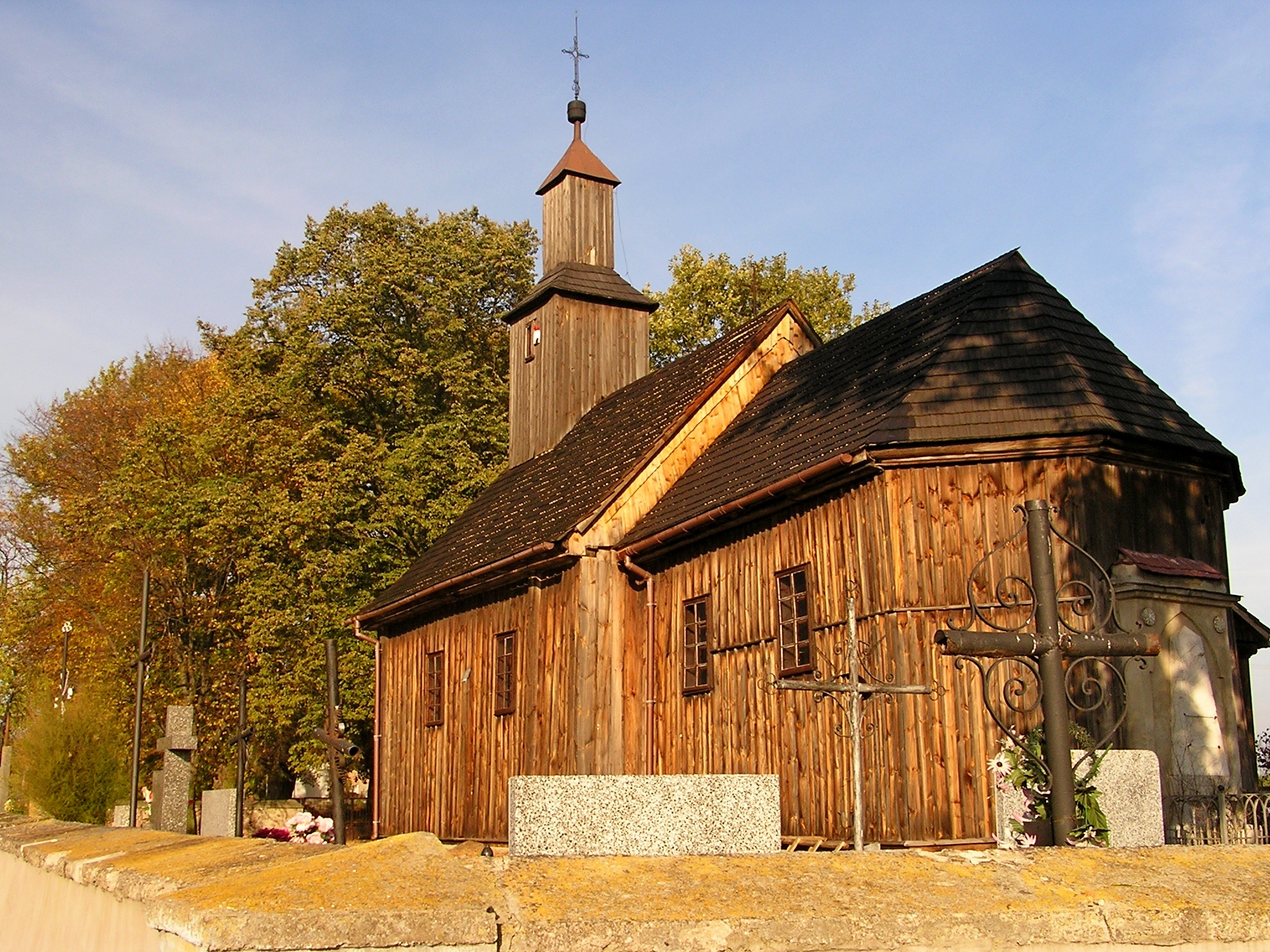
- Catholic church

- Location within Poland
- Coordinates: 51°22′N 19°29′E
- Country: Poland
- Voivodeship: Łódź
- County: Bełchatów
- Gmina: Bełchatów
- Population: 800

Postękalice [pɔstɛŋkaˈlʲit͡sɛ] is a village in the administrative district of Gmina Bełchatów, within Bełchatów County, Łódź Voivodeship, in central Poland.

== Demographics ==
Postękalice covers a land area of 0.442 square kilometers and is home to a population of 18 residents, evenly split between genders. Among these residents, 51.4% are male, accounting for 9 individuals, while the remaining 48.6% are female, also totaling 9 individuals.
