= Kielchinów =

- Village
- Location within Poland
- Coordinates: 51°20′25″N 19°26′8″E
- Country: Poland
- Voivodeship: Łódź
- County: Bełchatów
- Gmina: Bełchatów

Kielchinów [kʲɛlˈxʲinuf] is a village in the administrative district of Gmina Bełchatów, within Bełchatów County, Łódź Voivodeship, in central Poland.
