= Kurnos Pierwszy =

- Village
- Location within Poland
- Coordinates: 51°19′54″N 19°18′30″E
- Country: Poland
- Voivodeship: Łódź
- County: Bełchatów
- Gmina: Bełchatów
- Population: 220

Kurnos Pierwszy [ˈkurnɔs ˈpʲɛrfʂɨ] is a village in the administrative district of Gmina Bełchatów, within Bełchatów County, Łódź Voivodeship, in central Poland.
