= Ludwików, Bełchatów County =

Ludwików
- Village
- Location within Poland
- Coordinates: 51°21′N 19°20′E
- Country: Poland
- Voivodeship: Łódź
- County: Bełchatów
- Gmina: Bełchatów
- Population: 220

Ludwików [ludˈvʲikuf] is a village in the administrative district of Gmina Bełchatów, within Bełchatów County, Łódź Voivodeship, in central Poland.
