= Podwody-Kolonia =

- Village
- Location within Poland
- Coordinates: 51°25′42″N 19°17′23″E
- Country: Poland
- Voivodeship: Łódź
- County: Bełchatów
- Gmina: Bełchatów

Podwody-Kolonia [pɔdˈvɔdɨ kɔˈlɔɲa] is a village in the administrative district of Gmina Bełchatów, within Bełchatów County, Łódź Voivodeship, in central Poland.
