= Trębaczów, Świętokrzyskie Voivodeship =

Trębaczów
- Village
- Location within Poland
- Coordinates: 50°16′N 20°38′E
- Country: Poland
- Voivodeship: Świętokrzyskie
- County: Kazimierza
- Gmina: Opatowiec

Trębaczów [trɛmˈbat͡ʂuf] is a village in the administrative district of Gmina Opatowiec, within Kazimierza County, Świętokrzyskie Voivodeship, in south-central Poland. It lies approximately 7 km (4 mi) north-west of Opatowiec, 11 km (7 mi) east of Kazimierza Wielka, and 69 km (43 mi) south of the regional capital Kielce.
