= Rząsawa, Łódź Voivodeship =

Rząsawa
- Village
- Location within Poland
- Coordinates: 51°18′N 19°21′E
- Country: Poland
- Voivodeship: Łódź
- County: Bełchatów
- Gmina: Bełchatów

Rząsawa [ʐɔ̃ˈsava] is a village in the administrative district of Gmina Bełchatów, within Bełchatów County, Łódź Voivodeship, in central Poland.
