= Józefów, Gmina Bełchatów =

Józefów
- Village
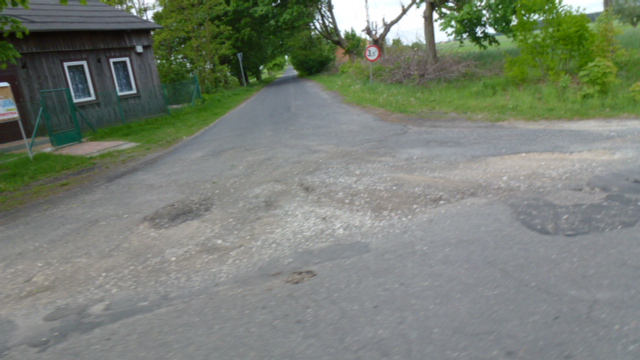

- Location within Poland
- Coordinates: 51°24′12″N 19°20′28″E
- Country: Poland
- Voivodeship: Łódź
- County: Bełchatów
- Gmina: Bełchatów

Józefów (Polish pronunciation: [juˈzɛfuf]) is a village in the administrative district of Gmina Bełchatów, within Bełchatów County, Łódź Voivodeship, in central Poland.
