= Janina, Łódź Voivodeship =

Janina
- Village
- Location within Poland
- Coordinates: 51°21′N 19°28′E
- Country: Poland
- Voivodeship: Łódź
- County: Bełchatów
- Gmina: Bełchatów

Janina [jaˈɲina] is a village in the administrative district of Gmina Bełchatów, within Bełchatów County, Łódź Voivodeship, in central Poland.
