= Zawady, Bełchatów County =

Zawady
- Village
- Location within Poland
- Coordinates: 51°23′30″N 19°22′25″E
- Country: Poland
- Voivodeship: Łódź
- County: Bełchatów
- Gmina: Bełchatów
- Population: 280

Zawady [zaˈvadɨ] is a village in the administrative district of Gmina Bełchatów, within Bełchatów County, Łódź Voivodeship, in central Poland.
