= Zdzieszulice Dolne =

- Village
- Location within Poland
- Coordinates: 51°20′N 19°25′E
- Country: Poland
- Voivodeship: Łódź
- County: Bełchatów
- Gmina: Bełchatów

Zdzieszulice Dolne [zd͡ʑɛʂuˈlʲit͡sɛ ˈdɔlnɛ] is a village in the administrative district of Gmina Bełchatów, within Bełchatów County, Łódź Voivodeship, in central Poland.
