= Helenów, Gmina Bełchatów =

Helenów
- Village
- Location within Poland
- Coordinates: 51°23′47″N 19°24′18″E
- Country: Poland
- Voivodeship: Łódź
- County: Bełchatów
- Gmina: Bełchatów

Helenów [xɛˈlɛnuf] is a village in the administrative district of Gmina Bełchatów, within Bełchatów County, Łódź Voivodeship, in central Poland.
