= Paulo Dybala =

Argentine footballer (born 1993)

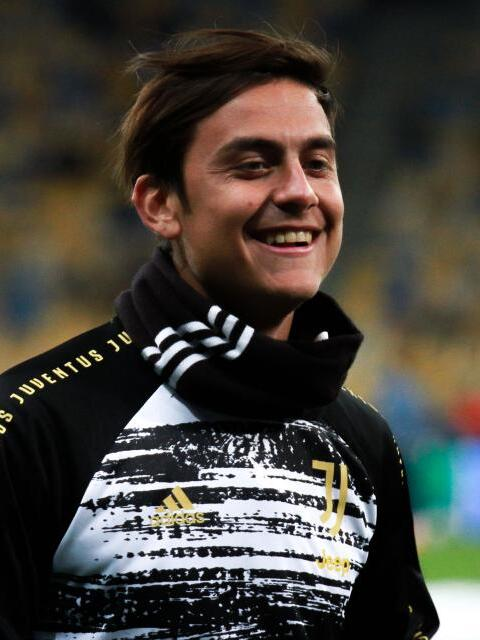
- Dybala with Juventus in 2020

Personal information
- Full name: Paulo Exequiel Dybala
- Date of birth: 15 November 1993 (age 33)
- Place of birth: Laguna Larga, Córdoba, Argentina
- Height: 1.77 m (5 ft 10 in)
- Positions: Forward; attacking midfielder

Team information
- Current team: Roma
- Number: 21

Youth career
- 2003–2011: Instituto

Senior career*
Years	Team	Apps	(Gls)
2011–2012	Instituto	38	(17)
2012–2015	Palermo	89	(21)
2015–2022	Juventus	210	(82)
2022–	Roma	106	(33)

International career^{‡}
2015–	Argentina	40	(4)
Medal record
Men's football
Representing Argentina
FIFA World Cup
Winner	2022 Qatar
Finalissima
Winner	2022 England
Copa América
Third place	2019 Brazil
- * Club domestic league appearances and goals as of 23:28, 21 November 2026 (UTC) ‡ National team caps and goals as of 10 September 2024

Paulo Exequiel Dybala (born 15 November 1993), nicknamed La Joya ("The Jewel"), is an Argentine professional footballer who plays as a forward for the Serie A club Roma and the Argentina national team.

Dybala began his club career in 2011 with Instituto de Córdoba before signing for Palermo in 2012, where he won a Serie B title. In 2015, Dybala signed for Juventus and won five Serie A titles and four Coppa Italia titles. He was also named Serie A Most Valuable Player in the 2019–20 season and was named in the Serie A Team of the Year four times; Dybala ranks tied as the club's ninth-highest all-time goalscorer. In 2022, Dybala signed for Roma on a free transfer following his seven seasons at Juventus.

Dybala made his senior debut for Argentina in 2015 at the age of 21. He has since made 40 appearances with 4 goals for his country and represented Argentina at the 2018 FIFA World Cup, the 2019 Copa América, and the 2022 FIFA World Cup, winning the latter title.

== Early life ==
Dybala was born in Laguna Larga, Córdoba, Argentina. His grandfather, Bolesław Dybała, was from the village of Kraśniów in Poland; he fled from his country of birth to Argentina during World War II. Some of his grandfather's family moved to Canada. Dybala's family also has Italian origins through his maternal great-grandmother, who was from the province of Naples. He holds Polish, Argentine, and Italian citizenship.

== Club career ==
=== Instituto de Córdoba ===
Nicknamed "La Joya" or "El pibe de la pensión", Dybala made his professional debut in the Primera B Nacional (Argentine second division) with his hometown club Instituto Atlético Central Córdoba at age 17. In total, he played 40 matches with the club, scoring 17 goals. He was the youngest to score a goal, beating the record of Mario Kempes. Dybala was also the first to play 38 consecutive matches in a professional league in the country (again edging Kempes), and was also the first to score two hat-tricks in a season. Dybala also scored in six consecutive games, surpassing the previous record of four matches.

=== Palermo ===
On 29 April 2012, US Città di Palermo president Maurizio Zamparini announced the signing of Dybala stating, "We have got Paulo Dybala – the new Sergio Agüero." Later the same day, however, Instituto's general secretary José Teaux stated that the man who had completed the negotiations with Palermo did not have the mandate to sell Dybala. Nonetheless, on 20 July 2012 Palermo released a press announcement confirming the signing of Dybala, who signed a four-year deal with the Sicilian club. According to the financial filing of the club, the transfer fee was €8.64 million.

Dybala made his debut for the club in a Serie A match against Lazio. He scored his first and second goal in Italy on 11 November 2012 when Palermo defeated Sampdoria at home, 2–0. Dybala had his breakthrough season in the 2014–15 Serie A where he scored ten goals in the first half of the season, forming a successful striking partnership with fellow Argentine–Italian Franco Vázquez and being linked with several top European clubs. He finished the season with 13 goals and 10 assists, which made him one of the top assist providers in the league.

=== Juventus ===
==== 2015–2018: Transfer and three domestic doubles ====
On 4 June 2015, Juventus announced the signing of Dybala on a five-year deal for a fee of €32 million (plus €8 million in add-ons). He was assigned the number 21 shirt, previously worn by Andrea Pirlo, who left the club that summer. On 8 August, he came on as a 61st-minute substitute for Kingsley Coman against Lazio in the 2015 Supercoppa Italiana. He scored the second goal in the 73rd minute in a 2–0 win in Shanghai. On 30 August 2015, Dybala scored his first league goal for the club in the 87th minute in a 2–1 defeat to Roma. In his first 16 appearances of the season, Dybala managed six goals and two assists in all competitions, with a ratio of a goal every 151 minutes, which was superior to Carlos Tevez's and Alessandro Del Piero's goalscoring ratios in their debut seasons with Juventus. In the club's history, only Roberto Baggio maintained a superior goalscoring record in the opening games of his debut season.

Dybala scored his first career Coppa Italia goal in a 4–0 win over cross-city rivals Torino on 16 December. On 23 February 2016, Dybala scored his first UEFA Champions League goal in a 2–2 home draw to Bayern Munich in Juventus' first round of 16 leg. On 15 March, it was announced Dybala would miss the second round of 16 leg of the Champions League against Bayern on 16 March due to an edema overload of his left soleus muscle. He returned to action four days later in a 4–1 away win over Torino, but was substituted after sustaining yet another injury. On 21 April, Dybala scored two goals in a 3–0 home win over Lazio, which took his league tally to 16 goals in 31 appearances and also saw him score his 20th goal of the season in all competitions in the process. He finished the season as Juventus' top scorer with 23 goals in all competitions and 19 goals in Serie A, as the club celebrated their Serie A title victory.

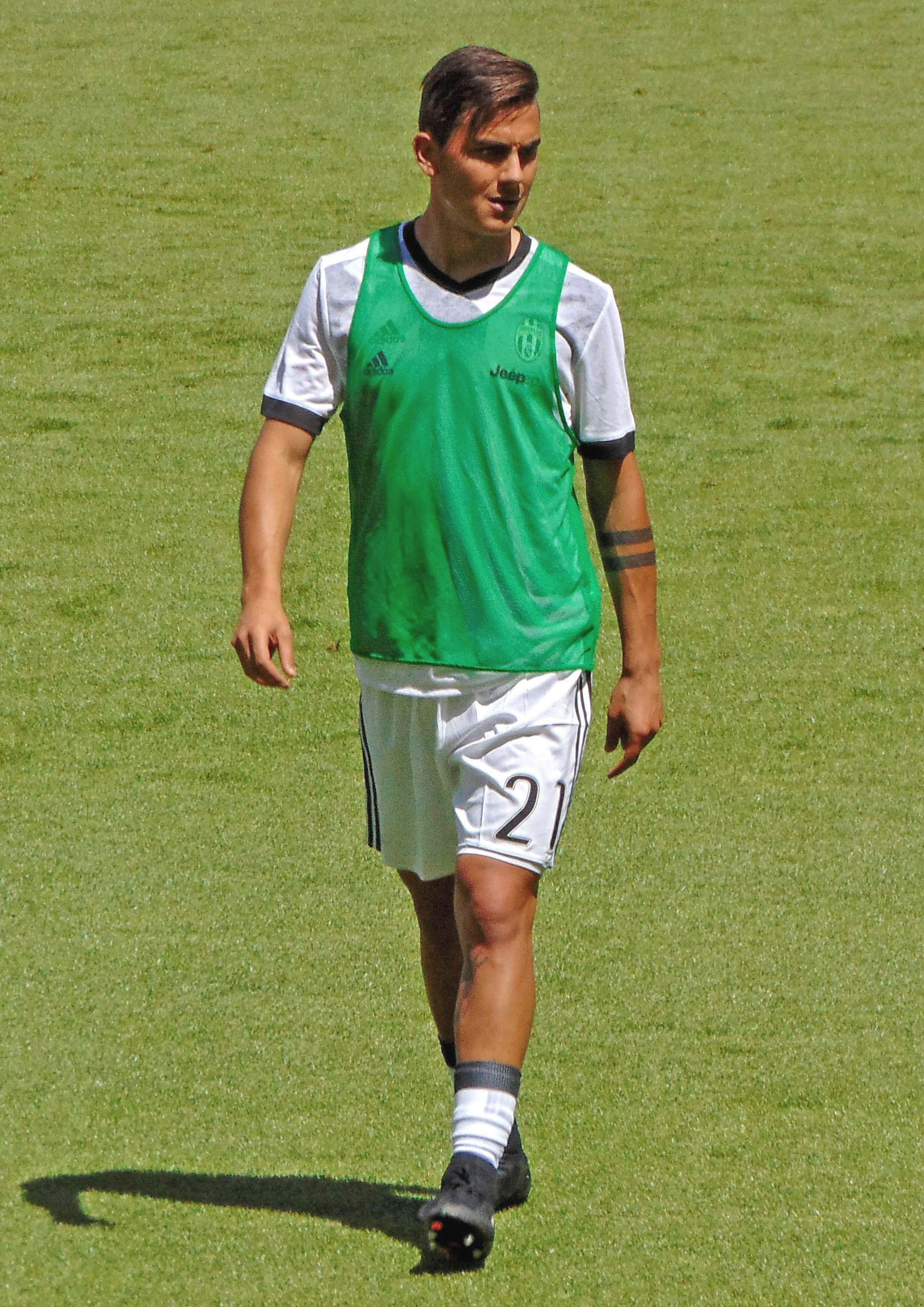
Dybala warming up for Juventus in 2017

Following the departure of Paul Pogba to Manchester United in the summer of 2016, Dybala was offered the number 10 jersey by Juventus, although he turned it down, preferring to keep the number 21 jersey that he had worn during his previous season. Following manager Massimiliano Allegri's switch to a 4–2–3–1 formation, the 2016–17 season saw Dybala operate in a deeper playmaking role behind the club's new signing Gonzalo Higuaín, which saw a decrease in his goalscoring output as he took on increasing defensive and creative duties. After struggling to score at the beginning of the season, Dybala scored his first goal of the 2016–17 campaign on 27 September, in a 4–0 away win over Dinamo Zagreb in the Champions League. He scored his first Serie A goal of the season that weekend, on 2 October, in a 3–0 away win over Empoli.

On 11 April, Dybala scored two goals in Juventus's first-leg Champions League quarter-final fixture against Barcelona, helping the club to a 3–0 home victory. On 13 April 2017, Dybala renewed his contract with Juventus until 2022. On 3 June, Dybala started in the 2017 Champions League final, but Juventus were defeated 4–1 by defending champions Real Madrid, missing out on the treble.

On 4 August 2017, Dybala was named one of the three finalists for the Forward of the 2016–17 UEFA Champions League season award. On 9 August, Dybala was confirmed to wear the number 10 shirt for Juventus. On 13 August he scored two goals in a 3–2 defeat to Lazio in the 2017 Supercoppa Italiana. On 15 August, Dybala placed sixth in the 2017 UEFA Best Player of the Year Award. On 26 August, Dybala scored his first hat-trick in Serie A in a 4–2 away win over Genoa. He repeated the feat on 17 September, in his 100th appearance for Juventus, scoring all three goals, including one free-kick, in the club's 3–1 away win over Sassuolo, marking his second hat-trick in Serie A. On 11 March 2018, Dybala scored a brace in a 2–0 home win over Udinese in Serie A; his first goal of the match was also his 100th career goal. He made his 150th appearance in Serie A in a 0–0 away draw against SPAL, on 17 March.

==== 2018–2022: Struggles and return to form ====
On 1 September 2018, Dybala made his 100th Serie A appearance for Juventus, coming on as a late second-half substitute in a 2–1 away win over Parma. On 2 October, Dybala scored a hat-trick in a 3–0 home win over Young Boys in the Champions League. In Juventus's following Champions League group match on 23 October, Dybala scored the only goal of the game in a 1–0 away win over Manchester United. With the arrival of Cristiano Ronaldo, Dybala was often deployed out of position in a deeper role by manager Allegri during the 2018–19 season; as a result of this positional switch, as well as struggles with injuries, and difficulties with his manager, Dybala suffered a loss of form, and his goalscoring output decreased significantly, as he managed to score only five goals in 30 league matches, and 10 goals across 42 appearances in all competitions. However, Juventus managed to retain the Serie A title.

Following a disappointing 2018–19 campaign, Dybala was initially linked with a move to Premier League side Tottenham Hotspur, although he ultimately remained with Juventus for the 2019–20 season. Although he was initially not expected to start under the club's new manager Maurizio Sarri, he eventually broke into the first XI and scored his first goal of the season on 6 October 2019, in a 2–1 away win over rivals Inter, to help his side overtake the Nerazzurri at the top of the Serie A table. On 7 December, he made his 200th appearance for Juventus in a 3–1 away defeat to Lazio in Serie A.

In the 2020 Coppa Italia final against Napoli on 17 June, following a 0–0 draw after regulation time, Dybala missed Juventus's first spot-kick in the resulting shoot-out, with his shot being saved by Alex Meret; Napoli ultimately won the match 4–2 on penalties. At the end of the season, Dybala was awarded the Serie A MVP award for the 2019–20 season. He finished the campaign with 11 goals and 6 assists, helping Juventus win their 9th consecutive title.

On 20 October 2020, Dybala made his first appearance of the new season in Juventus's opening Champions League game, coming on as a second–half substitute in a 2–0 away win over Dynamo Kyiv. Dybala scored his first goal of the season on 4 November against Ferencváros in a 4–1 win during a Champions League group stage match.

Prior to the start of the 2021–22 season, he was named vice-captain of the team. On 21 March 2022, Juventus chief executive officer Maurizio Arrivabene announced that the club had decided not to renew Dybala's contract which would expire in the summer, citing changes in the club's project following the arrival of striker Dušan Vlahović earlier that year. After being sidelined for months due to injury, Dybala made his return on 7 April 2021, scoring the winning goal of a 2–1 home win over Napoli. On 12 May, he scored a goal in a 3–1 away win over Sassuolo, to reach his 100th goal for Juventus in all competitions, hence he became the first non-European player in doing so. On 15 May 2022, Dybala announced on social media that he would leave Juventus at the end of the season. Dybala played his final home match for Juventus on 16 May 2022 against Lazio, being substituted by Martin Palumbo in the 78th minute, for which he received a standing ovation.

=== Roma ===
On 20 July 2022, Dybala signed for Roma on a three-year contract that runs until 30 June 2025. On 14 August, he made his debut for the club in a 1–0 away win against Salernitana in the Serie A. On 31 May, he scored the first goal of the 2023 UEFA Europa League final, which Roma eventually lost on penalties to Sevilla.

On 26 February 2024, he scored his first hat-trick for the club, in a 3–2 home win against Torino in Serie A. On 18 April, he scored his 50th goal for the club in a 2–1 home win against AC Milan in the 2023–24 UEFA Europa League quarter-finals, which saw Roma advance to the semi-finals of the competition. Following rumours linking him with a move to the Saudi Pro League, Dybala remained at Roma for the final year of his contract, with media outlets labeling him "central" to manager Daniele de Rossi's project.

In January 2025, an automatic extension clause in his contract was activated, allowing him stay with the club until 30 June 2026 on his reported base salary of €8 million per year. On July 13, 2026, Dybala signed a one-year extension, extending his stay at the club for another season.

== International career ==
Due to his family heritage, Dybala was eligible to play for Poland and Italy, but expressly stated that he feels Argentine and had always dreamed of playing for Argentina. Dybala stated "I feel 100 percent Argentinian, I wouldn't be happy in a national team that didn't feel like mine, to hear an anthem that isn't my own, in colours that don't belong to me".

=== 2015–2022: Early years ===
On 22 September 2015, Dybala was called for the first time for the Argentina senior team by manager Gerardo Martino, but his first appearance was on 13 October 2015, coming off the bench to replace Carlos Tevez in the 75th minute during a 2018 FIFA World Cup qualifying match against Paraguay in Asunción, which ended in a 0–0 draw. In May 2016, he was omitted from Argentina's 23-man squad for the Copa América Centenario. Although Juventus insisted that they would not release Dybala for the 2016 Summer Olympics in Rio de Janeiro, he was included in Martino's 35-man preliminary under-23 squad for the tournament on 24 May, but left out of the final tournament squad.

On 1 September 2016, Dybala was sent off in the first half of a 1–0 home victory against Uruguay in a 2018 World Cup qualification for a second bookable offence. On 13 June 2017, he set up a goal for Joaquín Correa in a 6–0 away friendly victory against Singapore.

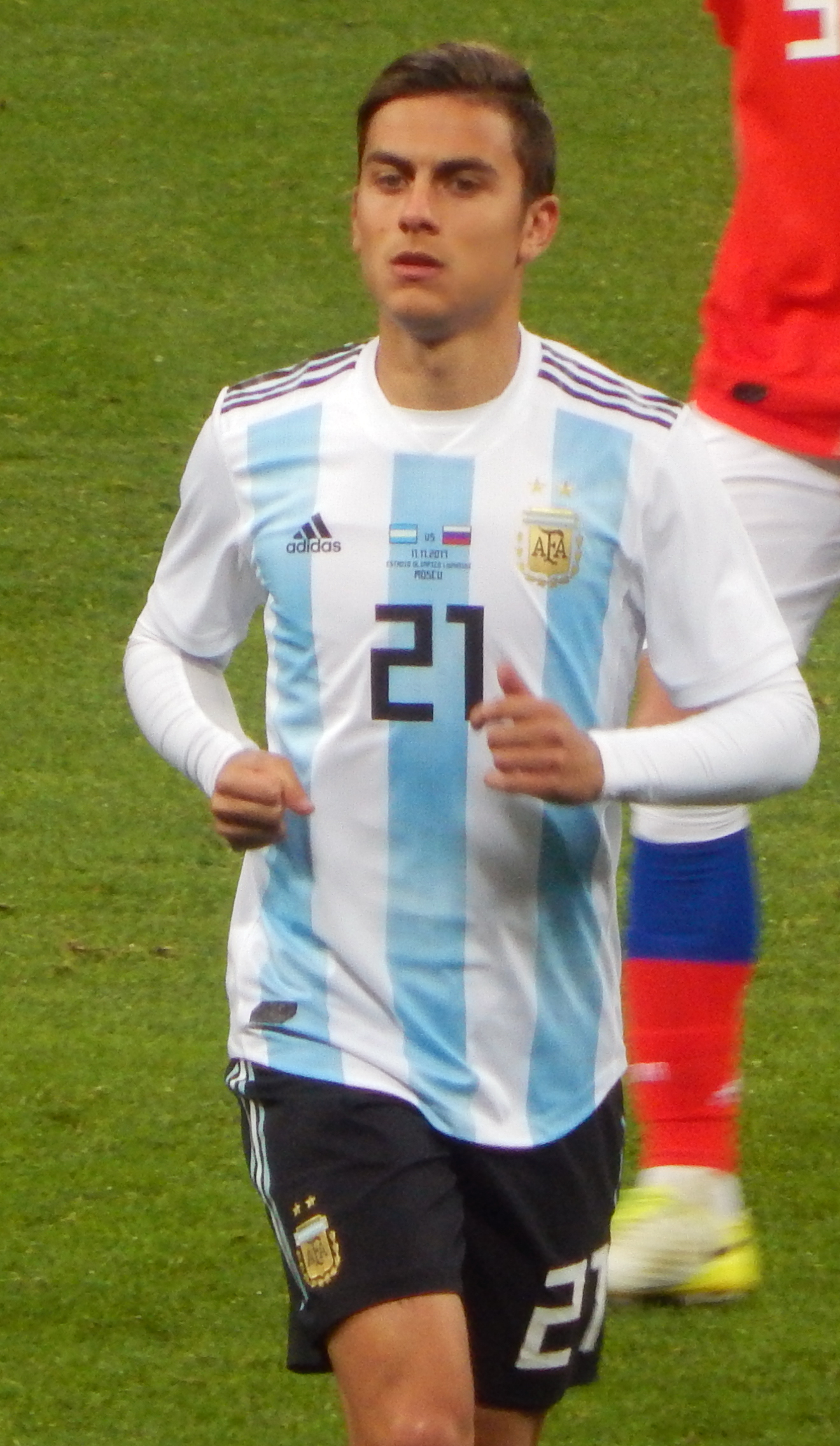
Dybala playing for Argentina in 2017

In May 2018, Dybala was named in Argentina's preliminary 35-man squad for the 2018 FIFA World Cup in Russia; later that month, he was included in Jorge Sampaoli's final 23-man squad for the tournament. He made his World Cup debut in Argentina's second group match on 21 June, coming on as a second-half substitute for Enzo Pérez in the 68th minute of an eventual 3–0 defeat to Croatia. This was his only appearance in the tournament, as Argentina were eliminated in the round of 16 on 30 June, following a 4–3 defeat to France. Later that year, Dybala scored his first senior international goal on 20 November, in a 2–0 friendly home victory against Mexico.

In May 2019, Dybala was included in Argentina manager Lionel Scaloni's preliminary 40-man squad for the 2019 Copa América. Later that month, he was included in the final 23-man squad for the tournament. In Argentina's final group match against Qatar on 23 June, Dybala assisted Agüero's goal in a 2–0 win after coming off the bench for Lautaro Martínez, which enabled them to advance to the knock-out stages of the competition. In the third-place match against Chile on 6 July, Dybala made his first start of the tournament, and scored Argentina's second goal in an eventual 2–1 win, to help his team capture the bronze medal.

=== 2022–present: World Cup winner and later years ===
On 1 June 2022, Dybala scored Argentina's final goal in a 3–0 victory against reigning European Champions Italy at Wembley Stadium in the 2022 Finalissima.

He was included in the final 26-man squad for the 2022 FIFA World Cup by Lionel Scaloni. On 13 December, he made his first appearance against Croatia, replacing Julián Álvarez, in a 3–0 semi-final victory. Five days later, in the final, he substituted Nicolás Tagliafico right before the penalty shoot-out as the match ended 3–3 at extra-time. He made a late defensive clearance in his team's defensive area, and scored the second penalty in the shoot-out as his team eventually defeated France 4–2 to win the World Cup.

In May 2024, Dybala was left out of Scaloni's squad for the 2024 Copa América, and two years later, he was not named in Argentina's squad for the 2026 FIFA World Cup.

== Style of play ==
An elegant player, Dybala is known for his powerful and accurate strikes, his creativity, and his dribbling, as he can beat opponents in one-on-one situations or beat multiple opponents. Due to his elite dribbling, he excels at counter-attacks and at beating the offside trap when making attacking runs. He is also renowned for his stamina and defensive work-rate. He is also capable of creating chances for his teammates due to his vision and his accurate passing. Despite his diminutive stature, Dybala is also effective at scoring headers due to his ability to anticipate defenders’ movements.

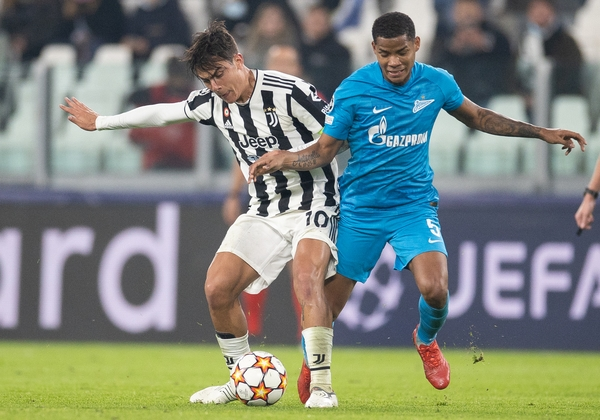
Dybala (left) in action for Juventus in 2021

A versatile forward, Dybala can play in any attacking position. He started out as a left winger for Instituto in Argentina but since moving to Italy, he has played as a right winger or as an attacking midfielder. Because of his involvement in his team's attacking plays and his goalscoring ability, his former manager at Juventus Massimiliano Allegri used Dybala as a central midfielder on some occasions (known as a "mezzala", in Italian), and described him as a "box-to-box player" ("tuttocampista", in Italian) in 2018. Dybala is also adept at scoring free-kicks and penalties. His playing style has drawn comparisons with compatriots Sergio Agüero, Javier Pastore, Carlos Tevez, Omar Sívori, Diego Maradona, and Lionel Messi, as well as former Italian forwards Vincenzo Montella, Alessandro Del Piero, and Roberto Baggio; the latter of whom described Dybala as the number 10 of the future in 2017. Widely considered to be a highly talented prospect in world football, in 2014, Don Balón named him one of the 100 most promising young players in the world born after 1993. Despite his talent, his consistency and leadership qualities have been questioned by the media. Moreover, he has struggled with numerous injuries.

After scoring a goal, Dybala is known for using his signature "mask" celebration; regarding the celebration, he commented: "My mask gesture isn't so much a goal celebration but rather a message. It's an ideal mask, which gladiators wore to fight. In Doha against Milan, after we lost Supercoppa, the idea of this celebration was born."

== Personal life ==
Dybala obtained Italian citizenship on 13 August 2012, in order to facilitate his move to Palermo and circumvent FIGC regulations that allow only two non-EU players in a Serie A team. Dybala initially attempted to obtain Polish citizenship through ancestry from his grandfather but the bureaucracy was too complex.

Dybala has several tattoos on his body: two stripes on his left arm, an Arabic tattoo, and a crowned football on his leg.

Since 2018, Dybala has been in a relationship with Oriana Sabatini, who is the daughter of the Venezuelan-Argentine actress Catherine Fulop and Osvaldo Sabatini, and the niece of legendary Argentine tennis champion, Gabriela Sabatini. On 20 July 2024, the two were married. The couple announced they were expecting their first child, on 30 September 2025. The child, a daughter named Gia, was born on 2 March 2026.

== Career statistics ==
=== Club ===
As of match played 21 November 2026

Appearances and goals by club, season and competition
Club	Season	League			National cup (Note: Includes Copa Argentina, Coppa Italia)		Continental		Other		Total	
Club	Season	Division	Apps	Goals	Apps	Goals	Apps	Goals	Apps	Goals	Apps	Goals
Instituto de Córdoba	2011–12	Primera B Nacional	38	17	0	0	—		2 (Note: Appearances in Argentine Primera División promotion/relegation playoffs)	0	40	17
Palermo	2012–13	Serie A	27	3	1	0	—		—		28	3
Palermo	2013–14	Serie B	28	5	2	0	—		—		30	5
Palermo	2014–15	Serie A	34	13	1	0	—		—		35	13
Palermo	Total		89	21	4	0	—		—		93	21
Juventus	2015–16	Serie A	34	19	4	2	7 (Note: Appearances in UEFA Champions League)	1	1 (Note: Appearance in Supercoppa Italiana)	1	46	23
Juventus	2016–17	Serie A	31	11	5	4	11	4	1	0	48	19
Juventus	2017–18	Serie A	33	22	4	1	8	1	1	2	46	26
Juventus	2018–19	Serie A	30	5	2	0	9	5	1	0	42	10
Juventus	2019–20	Serie A	33	11	4	2	8	3	1	1	46	17
Juventus	2020–21	Serie A	20	4	1	0	5	1	0	0	26	5
Juventus	2021–22	Serie A	29	10	4	2	5	3	1	0	39	15
Juventus	Total		210	82	24	11	53	18	6	4	293	115
Roma	2022–23	Serie A	25	12	2	1	11 (Note: Appearances in UEFA Europa League)	5	—		38	18
Roma	2023–24	Serie A	28	13	2	1	9	2	—		39	16
Roma	2024–25	Serie A	24	6	1	0	11	2	—		36	8
Roma	2025–26	Serie A	22	2	1	0	4	1	—		27	3
Roma	2026–27	Serie A	7	0	0	0	2	0	—		9	0
Roma	Total		106	33	6	2	37	10	—		149	45
Career total			443	153	34	13	90	28	8	4	575	198

=== International ===
As of match played 10 September 2024

Appearances and goals by national team and year
National team	Year	Competitive		Friendly		Total	
National team	Year	Apps	Goals	Apps	Goals	Apps	Goals
Argentina	2015	3 (Note: Appearances in 2018 FIFA World Cup qualification)	0	—		3	0
Argentina	2016	3	0	—		3	0
Argentina	2017	2	0	4	0	6	0
Argentina	2018	1 (Note: Appearance in 2018 FIFA World Cup)	0	5	1	6	1
Argentina	2019	4 (Note: Appearances in 2019 Copa América)	1	7	0	11	1
Argentina	2020	—				0	0
Argentina	2021	2 (Note: Appearances in 2022 FIFA World Cup qualification)	0	—		2	0
Argentina	2022	4 (Note: One appearance in 2022 FIFA World Cup qualification, one appearance and one goal in 2022 Finalissima, two appearances in 2022 FIFA World Cup)	0	1	1	5	1
Argentina	2023	—		2	0	2	0
Argentina	2024	2 (Note: Appearances in 2026 FIFA World Cup qualification)	1	—		2	1
Total		21	2	19	2	40	4

As of match played 10 September 2024
Scores and results list Argentina's goal tally first, score column indicates score after each Dybala goal.

List of international goals scored by Paulo Dybala
No.	Date	Venue	Cap	Opponent	Score	Result	Competition
1	20 November 2018	Estadio Malvinas Argentinas, Mendoza, Argentina	18	Mexico	2–0	2–0	Friendly
2	6 July 2019	Arena Corinthians, São Paulo, Brazil	24	Chile	2–0	2–1	2019 Copa América
3	1 June 2022	Wembley Stadium, London, England	33	Italy	3–0	3–0	2022 Finalissima
4	5 September 2024	Estadio Monumental, Buenos Aires, Argentina	39	Chile	3–0	3–0	2026 FIFA World Cup qualification

== Honours ==
Palermo

- Serie B: 2013–14

Juventus

- Serie A: 2015–16, 2016–17, 2017–18, 2018–19, 2019–20
- Coppa Italia: 2015–16, 2016–17, 2017–18, 2020–21
- Supercoppa Italiana: 2015, 2018
- UEFA Champions League runner-up: 2016–17

Roma

- UEFA Europa League runner-up: 2022–23

Argentina

- FIFA World Cup: 2022
- Finalissima: 2022

Individual

- Serie A Team of the Year: 2015–16, 2016–17, 2017–18, 2019–20
- Serie A Player of the Month: July 2020, November 2023, February 2024, April 2024, December 2024
- Serie A Most Valuable Player: 2019–20
- CIES Football Observatory Best Serie A Forward: 2015–16
- ESM Team of the Year: 2016–17
- UEFA Champions League Forward of the Season third place: 2016–17
- CIES Football Observatory Best Player of the Big-5 League Season third place: 2017–18
- UEFA Europa League Team of the Season: 2022–23
- Coppa Italia top goalscorer: 2016–17
- Serie A top assist provider: 2014–15

Records

- Supercoppa Italiana all-time top scorer: 4 goals
- Youngest player to score a hat-trick in Serie A for Palermo at the age of 21 years, 11 months, and 16 days.
- Fastest player to reach 50 goals for Juventus in Serie A in the club's history.
- First Juventus player to score in four consecutive away games in the UEFA Champions League.
- Scored the 25,000th goal in Juventus' history in a Serie A match against Torino.
- First non-European player to score 100 goals in Serie A (excluding naturalized players)
