= Borki, Bełchatów County =

Village in Greater Poland Voivodeship, Poland

Borki
- Village
- Location within Poland
- Coordinates: 51°19′21″N 19°17′31″E
- Country: Poland
- Voivodeship: Łódź
- County: Bełchatów
- Municipality: Bełchatów
- Time zone: UTC+1 (CET)
  - Summer (DST): UTC+2 (CEST)
- Postal code: PL-97-400
- Area code: +48 63
- Vehicle registration: EBE

Borki (Polish: [ˈbɔr.ki]) is a village in Łódź Voivodeship, Poland, located in the municipality of Bełchatów within Bełchatów County.
