= Domiechowice =

- Village
- Location within Poland
- Coordinates: 51°23′N 19°20′E
- Country: Poland
- Voivodeship: Łódź
- County: Bełchatów
- Gmina: Bełchatów

Domiechowice [dɔmʲɛxɔˈvʲit͡sɛ] is a village in the administrative district of Gmina Bełchatów, within Bełchatów County, Łódź Voivodeship, in central Poland.
