= Poręby, Gmina Bełchatów =

Poręby
- Village
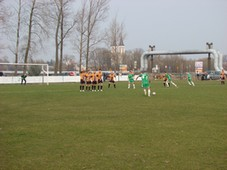

- Location within Poland
- Coordinates: 51°19′51″N 19°21′51″E
- Country: Poland
- Voivodeship: Łódź
- County: Bełchatów
- Gmina: Bełchatów

Poręby [pɔˈrɛmbɨ] is a village in the administrative district of Gmina Bełchatów, within Bełchatów County, Łódź Voivodeship, in central Poland.
