= Wola Mikorska =

- Village
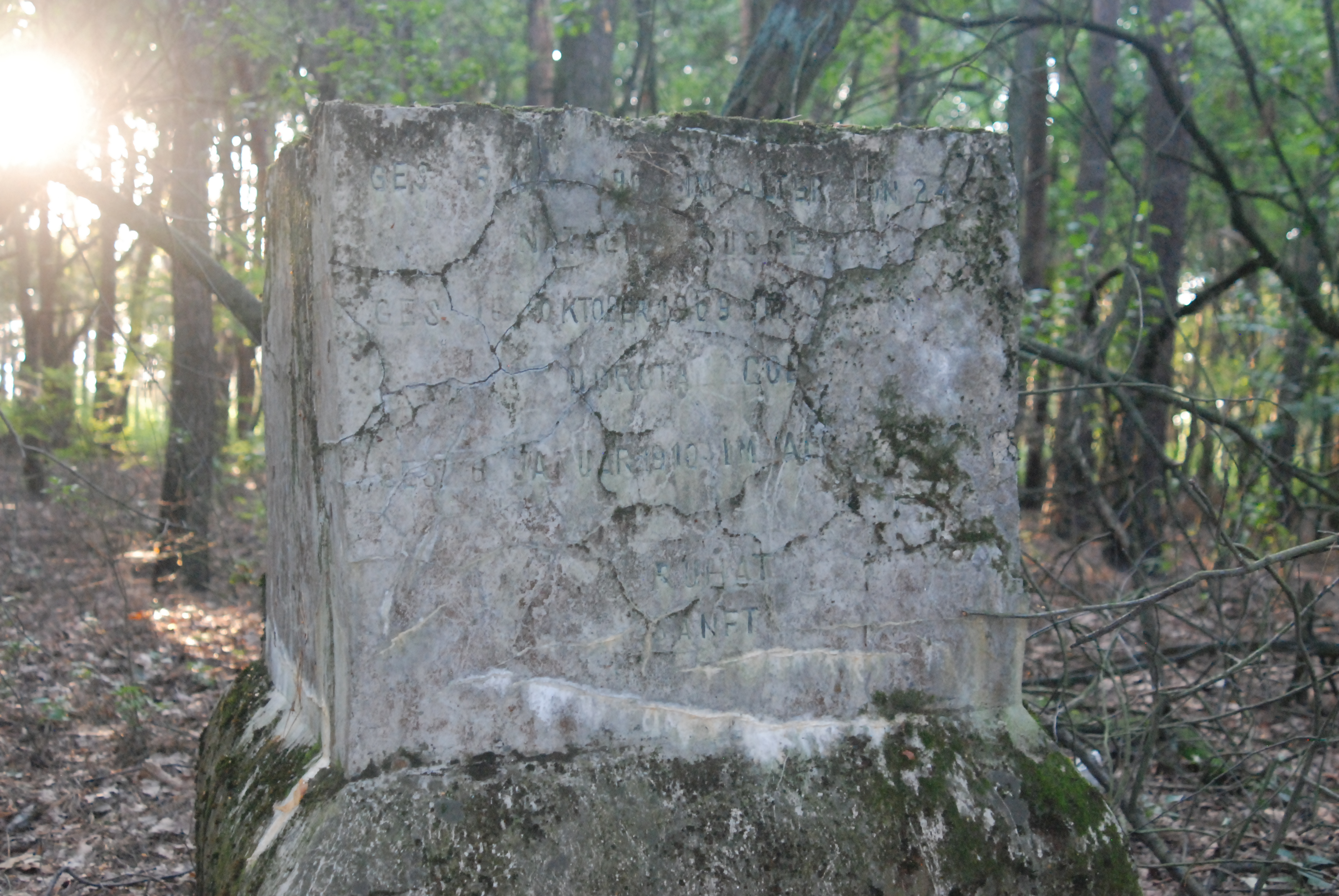

- Location within Poland
- Coordinates: 51°24′N 19°19′E
- Country: Poland
- Voivodeship: Łódź
- County: Bełchatów
- Gmina: Bełchatów
- Population: 210

Wola Mikorska [ˈvɔla mʲiˈkɔrska] is a village in the administrative district of Gmina Bełchatów, within Bełchatów County, Łódź Voivodeship, in central Poland.
