= Łękawa, Łódź Voivodeship =

Łękawa
- Village
- Location within Poland
- Coordinates: 51°16′20″N 19°24′1″E
- Country: Poland
- Voivodeship: Łódź
- County: Bełchatów
- Gmina: Bełchatów
- Population: 510

Łękawa [wɛŋˈkava] is a village in the administrative district of Gmina Bełchatów, within Bełchatów County, Łódź Voivodeship, in central Poland.
