= Dobiecin-Kolonia =

- Village
- Location within Poland
- Coordinates: 51°22′46″N 19°26′52″E
- Country: Poland
- Voivodeship: Łódź
- County: Bełchatów
- Gmina: Bełchatów
- Population: 51

Dobiecin-Kolonia [dɔˈbʲɛt͡ɕin kɔˈlɔɲa] is a village in the administrative district of Gmina Bełchatów, within Bełchatów County, Łódź Voivodeship, in central Poland.
