= Wólka Łękawska =

- Village
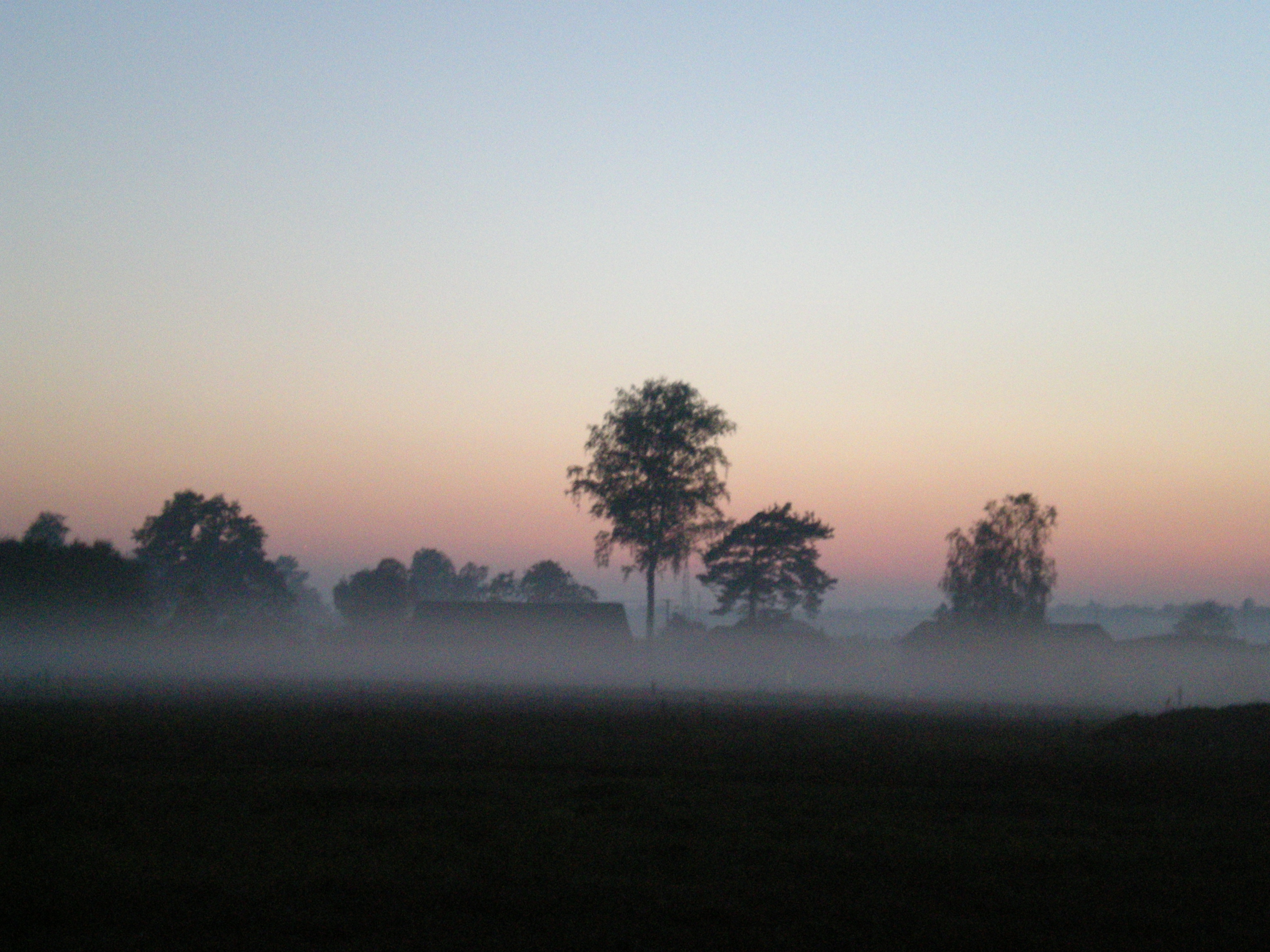

- Location within Poland
- Coordinates: 51°18′N 19°23′E
- Country: Poland
- Voivodeship: Łódź
- County: Bełchatów
- Gmina: Bełchatów
- Population: 240

Wólka Łękawska [ˈvulka wɛŋˈkafska] is a village in the administrative district of Gmina Bełchatów, within Bełchatów County, Łódź Voivodeship, in central Poland.
