= Gmina Bełchatów =

Gmina Bełchatów Bełchatów Commune
- Gmina
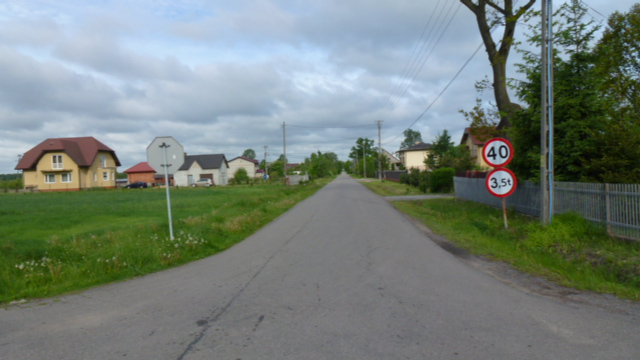

- Flag Coat of arms
- Interactive map of Gmina Bełchatów
- Coordinates (Bełchatów): 51°22′N 19°22′E
- Country: Poland
- Voivodeship: Łódź
- County: Bełchatów
- Seat: Bełchatów

Area
  - Total: 179.89 km^{2} (69.46 sq mi)

Population (2006)
  - Total: 9,306
  - Density: 51.73/km^{2} (134.0/sq mi)
- Time zone: UTC+1 (CET)
  - Summer (DST): UTC+2 (CEST)
- Website: www.belchatow-gm.bazagmin.pl

Gmina Bełchatów is a rural gmina (administrative district) in Bełchatów County, Łódź Voivodeship, in central Poland. Its seat is the town of Bełchatów, although the town is not part of the territory of the gmina.

The gmina covers an area of 179.89 square kilometres (69.5 sq mi), and as of 2006 its total population is 9,306.

== Villages ==
Gmina Bełchatów contains the villages and settlements of:

- Adamów
- Augustynów
- Borki
- Bukowa
- Dobiecin
- Dobiecin-Kolonia
- Dobrzelów
- Domiechowice
- Helenów
- Huta
- Janina
- Janów
- Józefów
- Kałduny
- Kielchinów
- Korczew
- Księży Młyn
- Kurnos Drugi
- Kurnos Pierwszy
- Ławy
- Łękawa
- Ludwików
- Mazury
- Mokracz
- Myszaki
- Niedyszyna
- Oleśnik
- Podwody
- Podwody-Kolonia
- Poręby
- Postękalice
- Rząsawa
- Wielopole
- Wola Kruszyńska
- Wola Mikorska
- Wólka Łękawska
- Zawadów
- Zawady
- Zdzieszulice Dolne
- Zdzieszulice Górne
- Zwierzchów

== Neighbouring gminas ==
Gmina Bełchatów is bordered by the town of Bełchatów and by the gminas of Drużbice, Grabica, Kamieńsk, Kleszczów, Kluki, Wola Krzysztoporska and Zelów.
