= Niedyszyna =

- Village
- Location within Poland
- Coordinates: 51°23′21″N 19°26′46″E
- Country: Poland
- Voivodeship: Łódź
- County: Bełchatów
- Gmina: Bełchatów

Niedyszyna [ɲɛdɨˈʂɨna] is a village in the administrative district of Gmina Bełchatów, within Bełchatów County, Łódź Voivodeship, in central Poland.
