= Gmina Opatowiec =

Gmina Opatowiec Opatowiec Commune
- Gmina
- Flag Coat of arms
- Interactive map of Gmina Opatowiec
- Coordinates (Opatowiec): 50°14′N 20°43′E
- Country: Poland
- Voivodeship: Świętokrzyskie
- County: Kazimierza
- Seat: Opatowiec

Area
  - Total: 68.41 km^{2} (26.41 sq mi)

Population (2006)
  - Total: 3,599
  - Density: 52.61/km^{2} (136.3/sq mi)
- Website: http://opatowiec.com.pl

Gmina Opatowiec is a rural gmina (administrative district) in Kazimierza County, Świętokrzyskie Voivodeship, in south-central Poland. Its seat is the village of Opatowiec, which lies approximately 18 kilometres (11 mi) east of Kazimierza Wielka and 73 km (45 mi) south of the regional capital Kielce.

The gmina covers an area of 68.41 square kilometres (26.4 sq mi), and as of 2006 its total population is 3,599.

The gmina contains part of the protected area called Nida Landscape Park.

== Villages ==
Gmina Opatowiec contains the villages and settlements of Charbinowice, Chrustowice, Chwalibogowice, Kamienna, Kęsów, Kobiela, Kocina, Kraśniów, Krzczonów, Ksany, Ławy, Mistrzowice, Opatowiec, Podskale, Rogów, Rzemienowice, Senisławice, Trębaczów, Urzuty and Wyszogród.

== Neighbouring gminas ==
Gmina Opatowiec is bordered by the gminas of Bejsce, Czarnocin, Gręboszów, Kazimierza Wielka, Koszyce, Nowy Korczyn, Wietrzychowice and Wiślica.
