= Księży Młyn, Łódź Voivodeship =

Księży Młyn
- Village
- Location within Poland
- Coordinates: 51°18′N 19°21′E
- Country: Poland
- Voivodeship: Łódź
- County: Bełchatów
- Gmina: Bełchatów
- Population: 233

Księży Młyn [ˈkɕɛ̃ʐɨ ˈmwɨn] is a village in the administrative district of Gmina Bełchatów, within Bełchatów County, Łódź Voivodeship, in central Poland.
