= Myszaki =

- Village
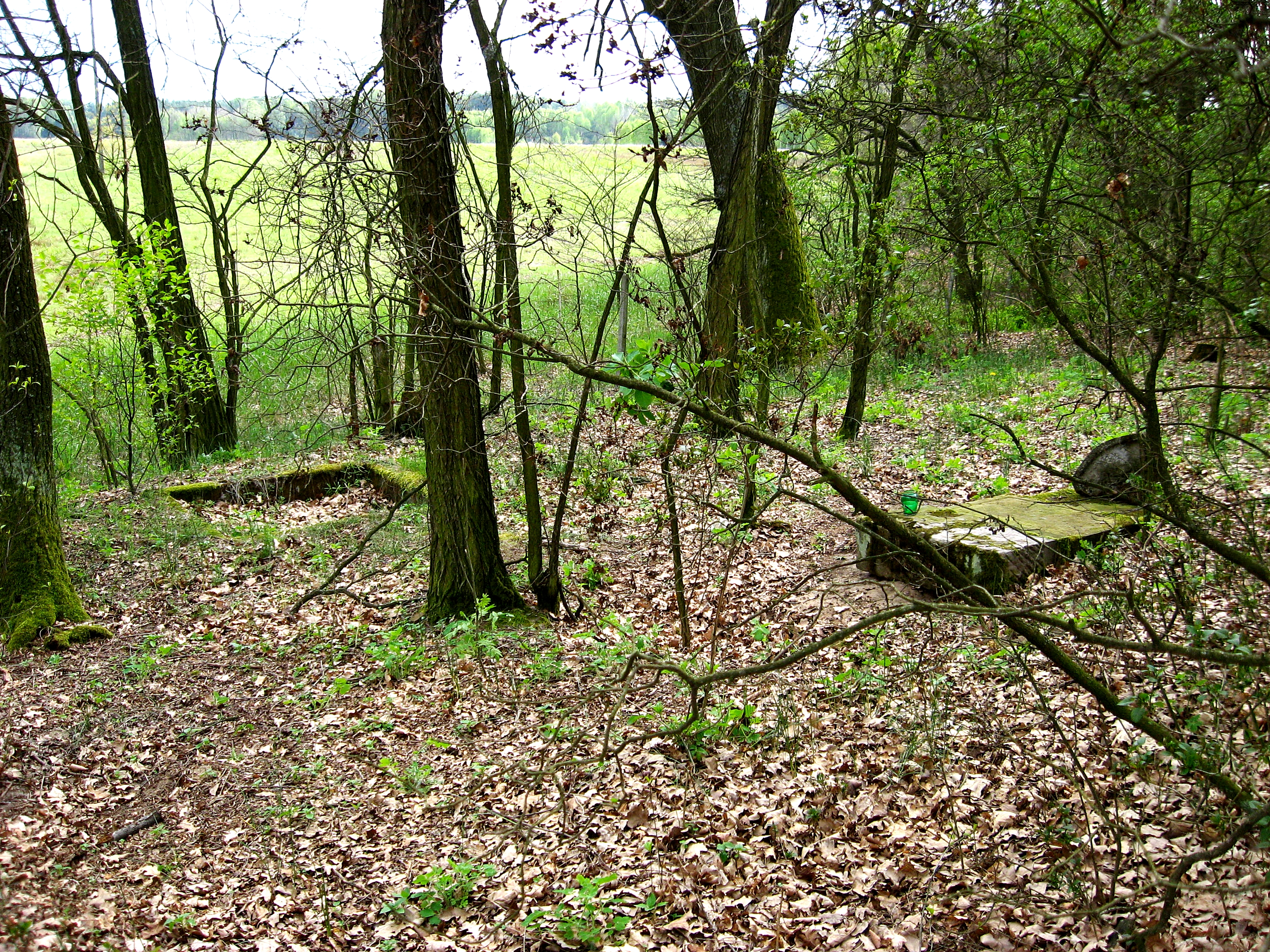
- Evangelical cemetery

- Location within Poland
- Coordinates: 51°22′56″N 19°25′4″E
- Country: Poland
- Voivodeship: Łódź
- County: Bełchatów
- Gmina: Bełchatów

Myszaki [mɨˈʂakʲi] is a village in the administrative district of Gmina Bełchatów, within Bełchatów County, Łódź Voivodeship, in central Poland.
