= Huta, Bełchatów County =

Huta
- Village
- Location within Poland
- Coordinates: 51°24′47″N 19°28′32″E
- Country: Poland
- Voivodeship: Łódź
- County: Bełchatów
- Gmina: Bełchatów

Huta [ˈxuta] is a village in the administrative district of Gmina Bełchatów, within Bełchatów County, Łódź Voivodeship, in central Poland.
