= Podskale, Świętokrzyskie Voivodeship =

Podskale
- Village
- Location within Poland
- Coordinates: 50°14′N 20°43′E
- Country: Poland
- Voivodeship: Świętokrzyskie
- County: Kazimierza
- Gmina: Opatowiec
- Population: 160

Podskale [pɔtsˈkalɛ] is a village in the administrative district of Gmina Opatowiec, within Kazimierza County, Świętokrzyskie Voivodeship, in south-central Poland. It lies approximately 18 km (11 mi) east of Kazimierza Wielka and 73 km (45 mi) south of the regional capital Kielce.
