= Dobrzelów =

- Village
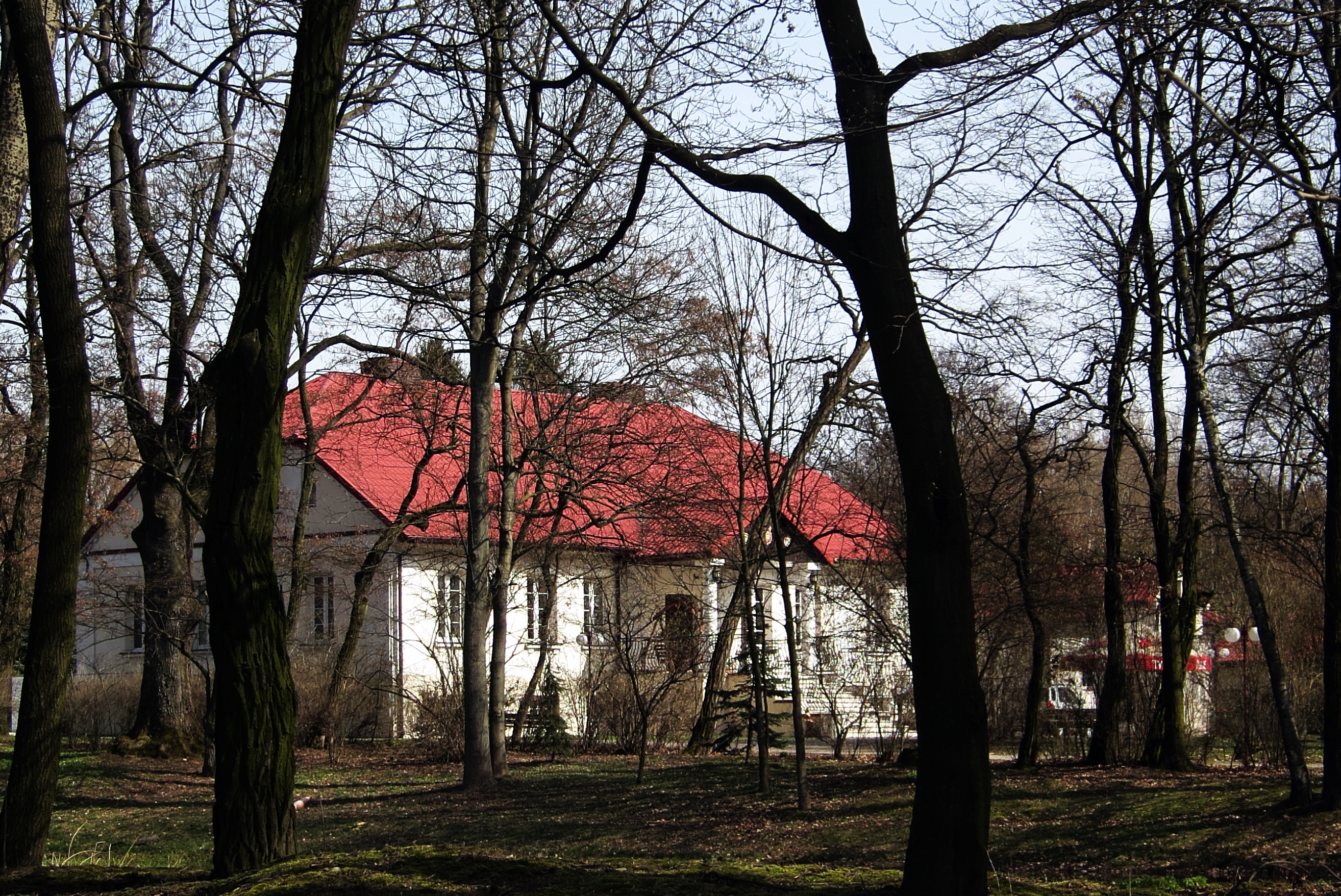

- Location within Poland
- Coordinates: 51°23′17″N 19°23′21″E
- Country: Poland
- Voivodeship: Łódź
- County: Bełchatów
- Gmina: Bełchatów

Dobrzelów [dɔˈbʐɛluf] is a village in the administrative district of Gmina Bełchatów, within Bełchatów County, Łódź Voivodeship, in central Poland.
