= Wola Kruszyńska =

- Village
- Location within Poland
- Coordinates: 51°24′44″N 19°27′20″E
- Country: Poland
- Voivodeship: Łódź
- County: Bełchatów
- Gmina: Bełchatów

Wola Kruszyńska [ˈvɔla kruˈʂɨɲska] is a village in the administrative district of Gmina Bełchatów, within Bełchatów County, Łódź Voivodeship, in central Poland.
