= Mokracz =

- Village
- Location within Poland
- Coordinates: 51°20′32″N 19°27′42″E
- Country: Poland
- Voivodeship: Łódź
- County: Bełchatów
- Gmina: Bełchatów

Mokracz (Polish: [ˈmɔkrat͡ʂ]) is a village in the administrative district of Gmina Bełchatów, within Bełchatów County, Łódź Voivodeship, in central Poland.
