= Adamów, Gmina Bełchatów =

Adamów
- Village
- Location within Poland
- Coordinates: 51°24′27″N 19°18′38″E
- Country: Poland
- Voivodeship: Łódź
- County: Bełchatów
- Gmina: Bełchatów

Adamów [aˈdamuf] is a village in the administrative district of Gmina Bełchatów, within Bełchatów County, Łódź Voivodeship, in central Poland.
