= Oleśnik, Łódź Voivodeship =

Oleśnik
- Village
- Location within Poland
- Coordinates: 51°19′9″N 19°20′57″E
- Country: Poland
- Voivodeship: Łódź
- County: Bełchatów
- Gmina: Bełchatów
- Population: 220

Oleśnik [ɔˈlɛɕɲik] is a village in the administrative district of Gmina Bełchatów, within Bełchatów County, Łódź Voivodeship, in central Poland.
