= Witold Zawadowski =

Polish radiologist (1888–1980)

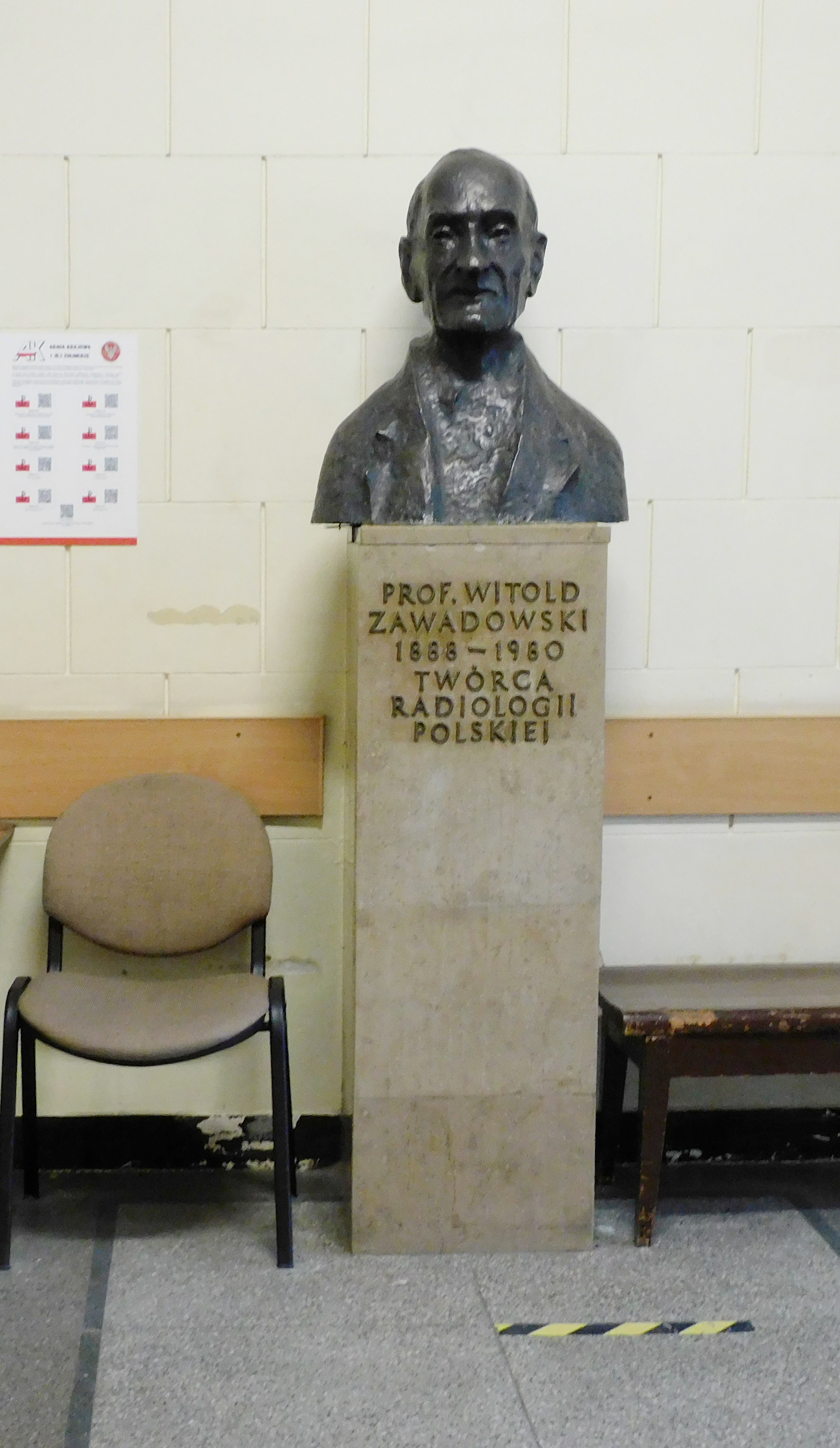
Witold Zawadowski bust

Witold Eugeniusz Zawadowski (23 February 1888 in Skobełka near Horochow, Volhynia – 12 August 1980 in Warsaw) was a Polish radiologist, one of the pioneers of Polish radiology. He was a brother of Jan Wacław.

Zawadowski was a professor at the University of Warsaw (since 1946), professor at the Medical University of Warsaw (since 1950), member of the Polish Academy of Learning (since 1948), member of the Polish Academy of Sciences (since 1952) and national radiology consultant. From 1930, he was an editor of Polski Przegląd Radiologiczny (since 1955 under name Polski Przegląd Radiologii i Medycyny Nuklearnej).

His main area of study was roentgen-diagnostics of the chest organs.
