= Wacław Zawadowski =

Polish painter (1891–1982)

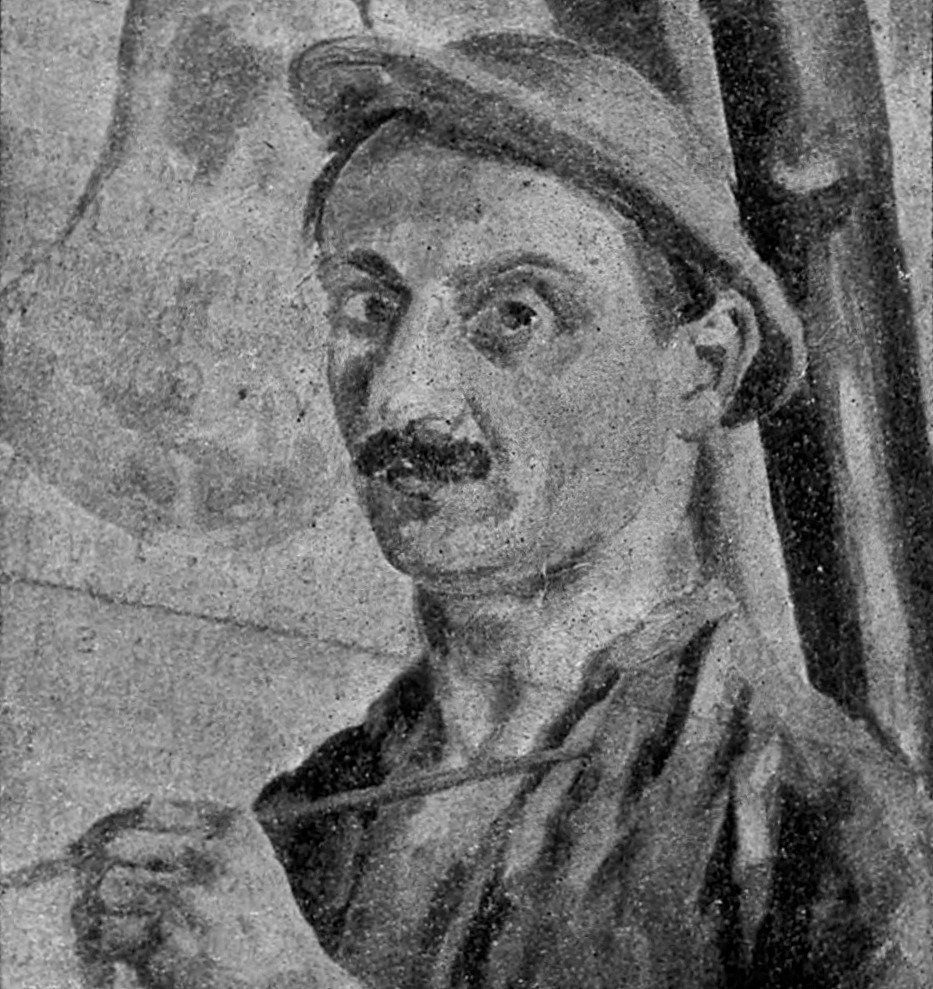
Wacław Zawadowski - Autoportret (-1925)

Jan Wacław Zawadowski, pseudonym Zawado, (14 April 1891 – 15 November 1982) was a Polish painter of landscapes (mainly of Provence), still life, portraits, and figural scenes. Influenced mainly by Post-Impressionism, he was a pupil of Józef Pankiewicz. Co-founder of the Cercle des Artistes Polonais in Paris.

== Biography ==
Jan-Waclaw Zawadowksi was born on 14 April 1891 in Volhynie in Russian Poland. His brother was Witold Eugeniusz. When he was 13, Zawadowski discovered French paintings.

In 1910 he began to study at the Fine Art School of Cracovie in professor Józef Pankiewicz's studio. In 1912, Pankiewicz encouraged Zawadowski to go to Paris. After a brief stay in La Ruche, he moved to Montmartre. Then, he became active in the artistic community of Montparnasse. He signed his first and last contract of exclusivity with German art dealer Paul Cassirer, who organized many expositions in Germany. During the war, Zawadowski went to Spain for four years, mostly in Madrid where he met with friends, Polish painters, and Arthur Rubinstein.

In 1919, when the war ended, he went back to Paris. In 1920, Amedeo Modigliani died and Zawadowski moved into his studio. During the summer, Zawadowski visited Saint-Cirq Lapopie with Tsuguharu Foujita, Sanary or Le Blanc with Chaïm Soutine, and Bretagne where he painted landscapes.

Very tied with Leopold Zborowski, one of the greatest modern art dealer (for example he worked with Modigliani) Zawado gave him to sale his paintings. It's Zborowski who ask him to signed his paintings as Zawado instead of Zawadowski. In 1928, he enter into the « Circle of Polish artists in Paris ». Between 1920 and 1930 he took part at the artistic life of the first School of Paris. He speaks to many writers, musicians and of course painters. He exhibited in Poland, in Paris (Benezit's Gallery) and in London. In 1930 Zawado starts his stays in Aix-en-Provence. In 1938 he take the direction of the Polish Institut of Fine Arts in Paris.

In 1945 he stay definitively in Aix but still keep a studio in Paris. Being in the south without other painter's influences made him grow his very own style. His paintings now reflect the particular light of the south of France.

During the 60s his first solo exhibitions starts in Aix, specially in Gallery Spinazzola. From now on Zawado mostly exhibited in the south of France. However a great retrospective took place in Cracovie in 1975, followed by a personal show in 1976 in New-York. It's therefore a whole world made of writers, musicians and painters who starts to visit him.

On 15 November 1982, Zawado died at his property in Provence.
