= Korczew, Bełchatów County =

Korczew
- Village
- Location within Poland
- Coordinates: 51°21′22″N 19°27′3″E
- Country: Poland
- Voivodeship: Łódź
- County: Bełchatów
- Gmina: Bełchatów

Korczew [ˈkɔrt͡ʂɛf] is a village in the administrative district of Gmina Bełchatów, within Bełchatów County, Łódź Voivodeship, in central Poland.
