= Mazury, Łódź Voivodeship =

Mazury
- Village
- Location within Poland
- Coordinates: 51°19′55″N 19°23′27″E
- Country: Poland
- Voivodeship: Łódź
- County: Bełchatów
- Gmina: Bełchatów

Mazury [maˈzurɨ] is a village in the administrative district of Gmina Bełchatów, within Bełchatów County, Łódź Voivodeship, in central Poland.
