= Augustynów, Bełchatów County =

Augustynów
- Village
- Location within Poland
- Coordinates: 51°19′22″N 19°25′56″E
- Country: Poland
- Voivodeship: Łódź
- County: Bełchatów
- Gmina: Bełchatów

Augustynów [au̯ɡusˈtɨnuf] is a village in the administrative district of Gmina Bełchatów, within Bełchatów County, Łódź Voivodeship, in central Poland.
