= Kałduny, Łódź Voivodeship =

Kałduny
- Village
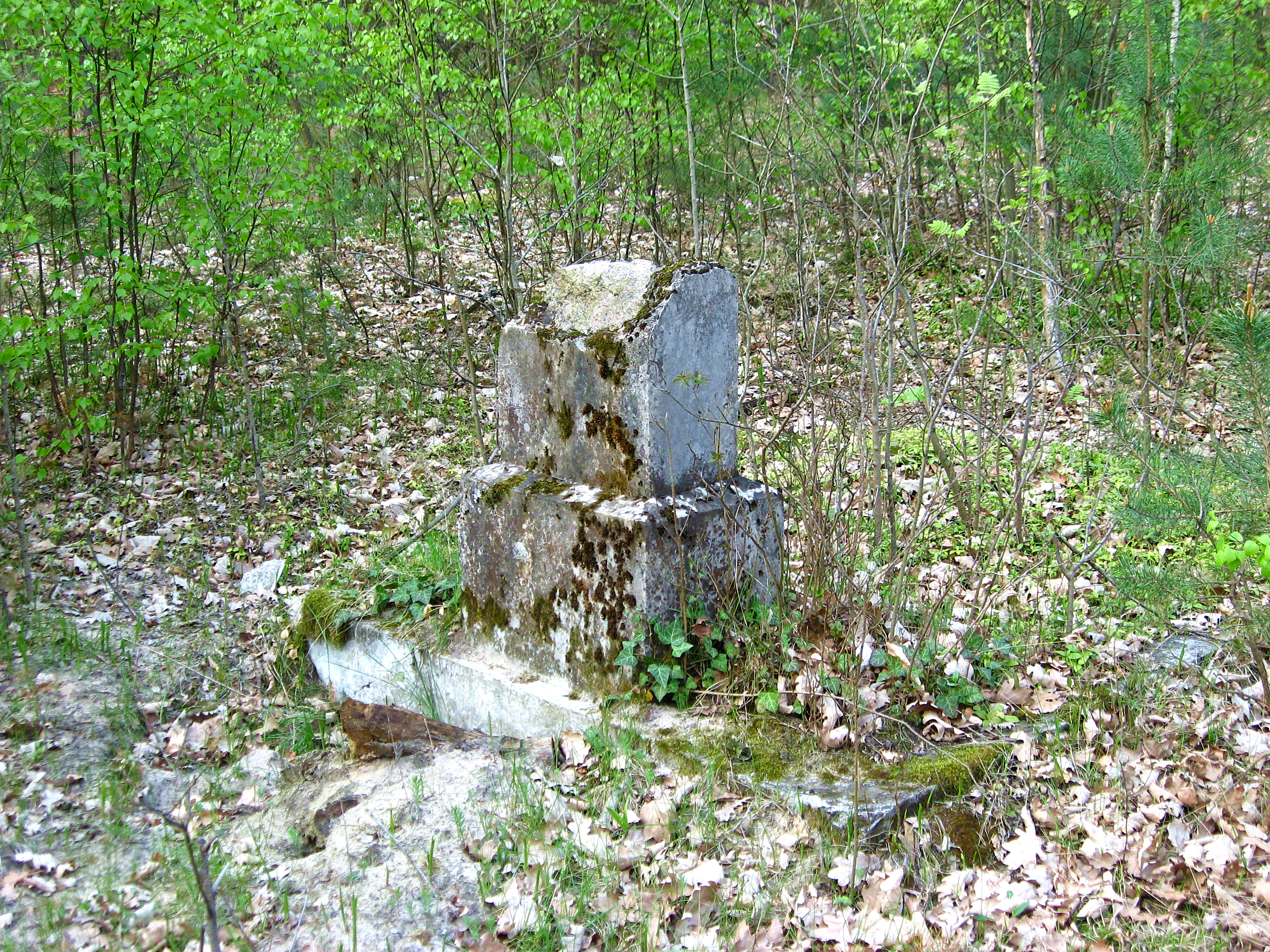
- Evangelical cemetery

- Location within Poland
- Coordinates: 51°24′21″N 19°22′2″E
- Country: Poland
- Voivodeship: Łódź
- County: Bełchatów
- Gmina: Bełchatów

Kałduny [kau̯ˈdunɨ] is a village in the administrative district of Gmina Bełchatów, within Bełchatów County, Łódź Voivodeship, in central Poland.
