= Dobiecin, Łódź Voivodeship =

Dobiecin
- Village
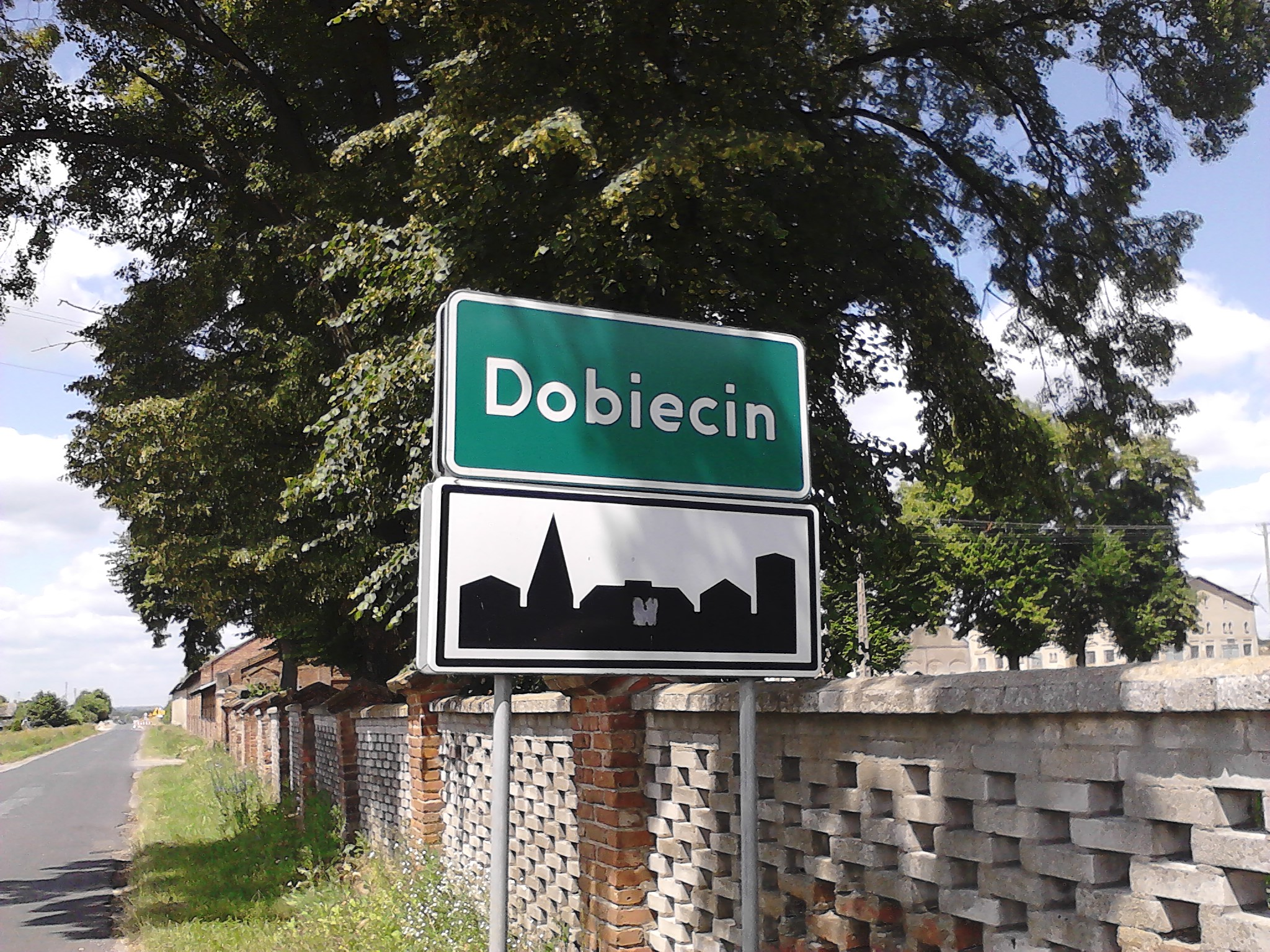

- Location within Poland
- Coordinates: 51°22′2″N 19°25′33″E
- Country: Poland
- Voivodeship: Łódź
- County: Bełchatów
- Gmina: Bełchatów

Dobiecin [dɔˈbʲɛt͡ɕin] is a village in the administrative district of Gmina Bełchatów, within Bełchatów County, Łódź Voivodeship, in central Poland.
