= Ławy, Łódź Voivodeship =

Ławy
- Village
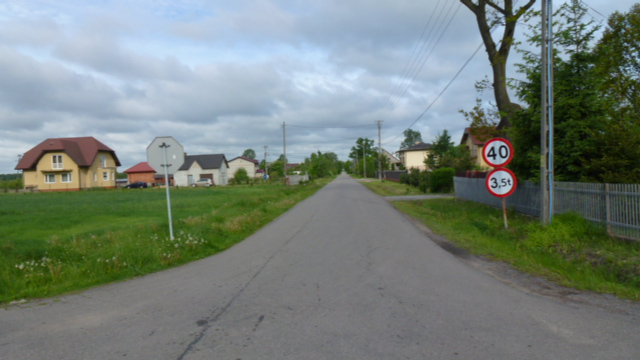

- Location within Poland
- Coordinates: 51°23′48″N 19°20′20″E
- Country: Poland
- Voivodeship: Łódź
- County: Bełchatów
- Gmina: Bełchatów
- Population (approx.): 250

Ławy [ˈwavɨ] is a village in the administrative district of Gmina Bełchatów, within Bełchatów County, Łódź Voivodeship, in central Poland.

The village has an approximate population of 250.
