= Zawadów, Łódź Voivodeship =

Zawadów
- Village
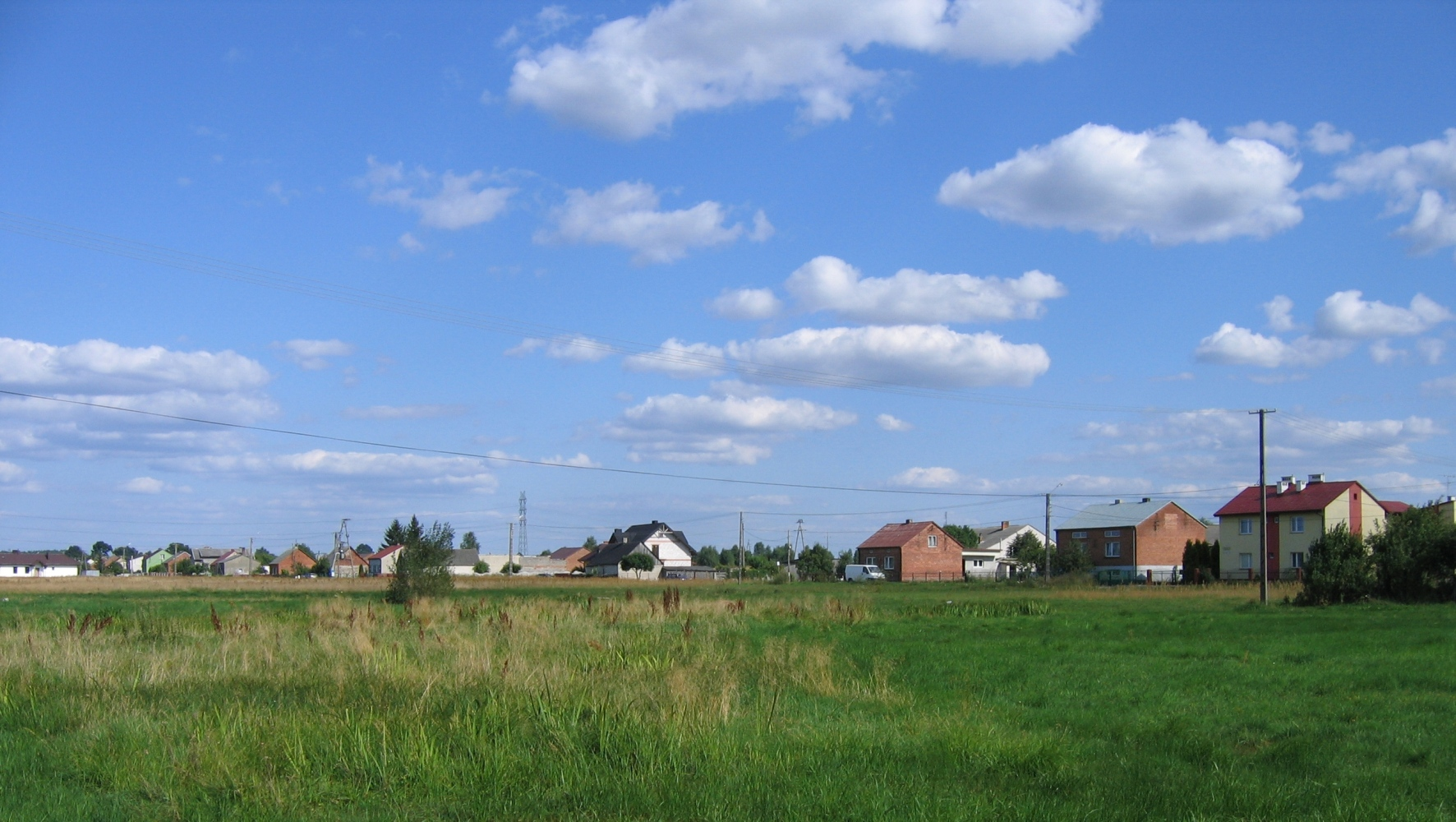

- Location within Poland
- Coordinates: 51°17′44″N 19°25′43″E
- Country: Poland
- Voivodeship: Łódź
- County: Bełchatów
- Gmina: Bełchatów
- Population (approx.): 220

Zawadów [zaˈvaduf] is a village in the administrative district of Gmina Bełchatów, within Bełchatów County, Łódź Voivodeship, in central Poland.

The village has an approximate population of 220.
