= Opatowiec =

- Town
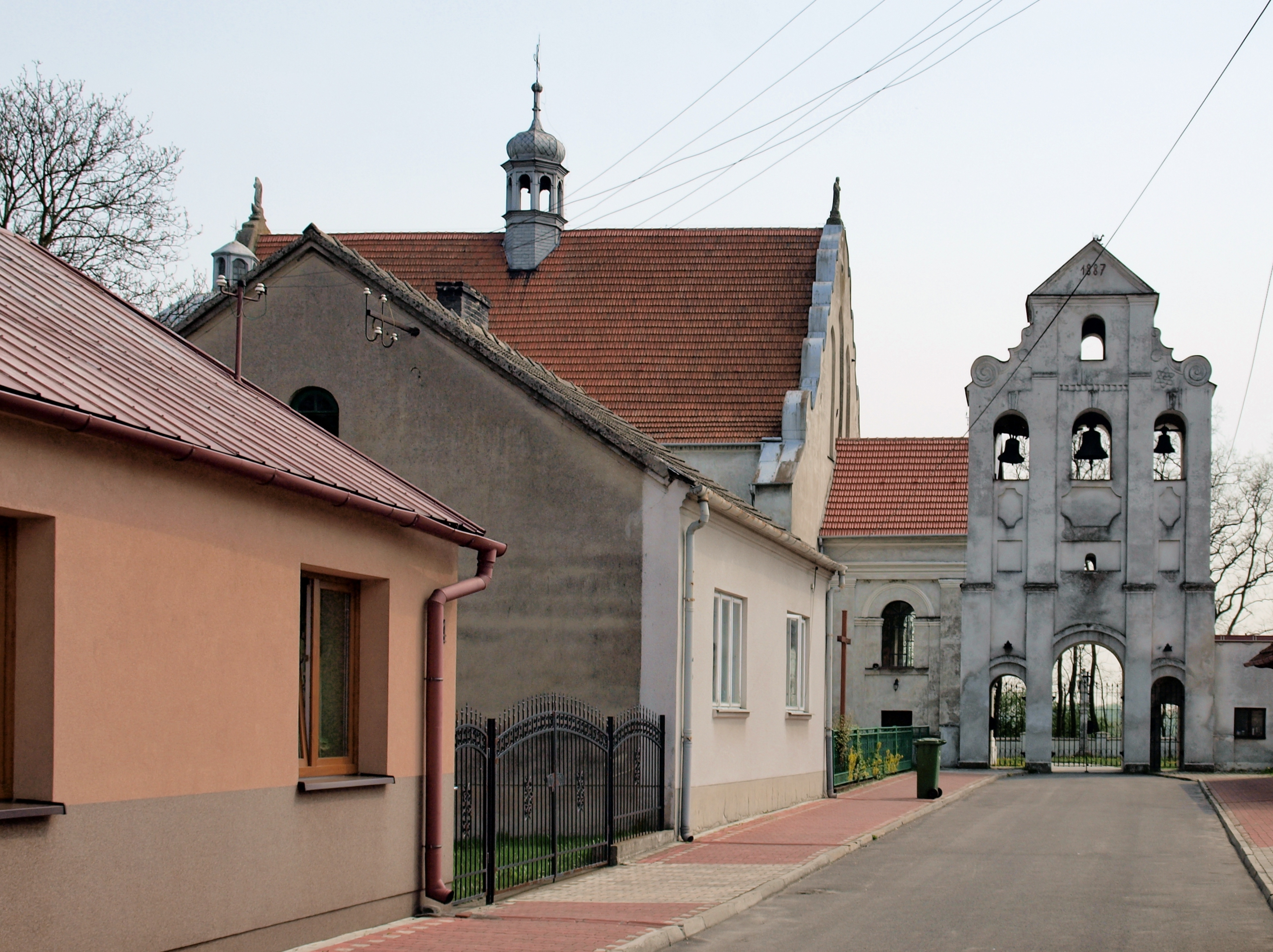
- Catholic church of St. James

- Coat of arms

- Location within Poland
- Coordinates: 50°14′N 20°43′E
- Country: Poland
- Voivodeship: Świętokrzyskie
- County: Kazimierza
- Gmina: Opatowiec
- Town rights: 1271

Government
  - Mayor: Sławomir Kowalczyk (Ind.)
- Elevation: 200 m (660 ft)

Population (2019)
  - Total: 338
- Time zone: UTC+1 (CET)
  - Summer (DST): UTC+2 (CEST)
- Postal code: 28-520
- Area code: +48 41
- Vehicle registration: TKA
- Website: www.opatowiec.com.pl

Opatowiec [ɔpaˈtɔvjɛt͡s] is a town in Kazimierza County, Świętokrzyskie Voivodeship, in southern Poland. It is the seat of the gmina (administrative district) called Gmina Opatowiec. It lies in Lesser Poland, on the left bank of the River Vistula (opposite the confluence of the Dunajec), approximately 18 km (11 mi) east of Kazimierza Wielka and 73 km (45 mi) south of the regional capital Kielce. It regained its urban status on 1 January 2019, becoming the smallest town in Poland, with only 338 inhabitants. Opatowiec is situated on the National Road Nr. 79 (Warsaw–Bytom). Local points of interest include a 15th-century Dominican church and a central park.

== History ==
The village of Opatowiec was first mentioned in 1085, when Judyta, the wife of Prince Władysław I Herman, presented it to the Benedictine monks from Tyniec. In 1271, Duke Boleslaw V the Chaste granted Opatowiec a town charter under Magdeburg rights, upon the request of abbot Modlibob. The town became a local trade center, due to its location along the Vistula waterway, and on a merchant trail from Silesia in the west to Kievan Rus in the east. In 1283, abbot Tomasz founded an abbey of the Dominican Order, and in 1341, King Casimir III the Great granted Opatowiec the right to organize trade fairs. In the mid-14th century, Opatowiec was inhabited by around 1,500 people. Here, in 1474, an assembly of Lesser Poland's nobility took place, during which war with Hungarian king Matthias Corvinus was discussed. In the same year, King Casimir IV Jagiellon hosted at Opatowiec envoys from the Republic of Venice, to discuss war with the Ottoman Empire. By 1500, Opatowiec had a parish church, bath houses, hospital and several guilds. In 1579, it had 55 different workshops, and four mills. For centuries, the town was administratively located in the Wiślica County in the Sandomierz Voivodeship in the Lesser Poland Province.

Like almost all municipal centers of Lesser Poland, the town was completely destroyed by Swedish soldiers in the Deluge (1655–1660). In 1772, when after the First Partition of Poland the Tyniec abbey became part of Austrian Galicia, Opatowiec changed hands and became the property of the government. Soon afterwards, it was purchased by the Walewski family. After the Polish victory in the Austro-Polish War of 1809, it became part of the short-lived Duchy of Warsaw, and after the duchy's dissolution in 1815, the town was part of Russian-controlled Congress Poland, and began to lose its importance. By 1862, it had only 459 residents and 67 houses. In 1869, as a punishment for the January Uprising, it was stripped of its town charter and became a mere village.

Opatowiec suffered during World War I and later further destruction was brought by World War II. In September 1939, the village was burned by the Wehrmacht and on 8 September 1939 German soldiers shot 45 Polish prisoners of war. On 28 July 1944, a skirmish took place here between a local Home Army unit and the Russian Liberation Army under Nazi command. As a result, 31 persons were murdered, including children.
