= CLO =

CLO may refer to:

== Institutional positions ==
- Chief Learning Officer, training post
- Chief Legal Officer of a legal department

== Locations ==
- Alfonso Bonilla Aragón International Airport, Palmira, Colombia, IATA code
- Civic Light Opera (disambiguation), several US theatres
- Cło, Świętokrzyskie Voivodeship, Gmina Kazimierza Wielka, Kazimierza County, Poland
- Coolaroo railway station, Melbourne

== Organizations ==
- Central Legal Office of NHS Scotland
- Conselh de la Lenga Occitana (Occitan Language Council)
- Congress of Labor Organizations, a trade union in the Philippinnes
- Cooperative Living Organization, a housing cooperative in Gainesville, FL, US
- Federation of Civil Service Organizations (Centrale van Landsdienaren Organisaties), Suriname

== Technical terms ==
- Collateralized loan obligation, an asset-backed security
- Color Light Output or color brightness of a projector

== People ==
- Alberto Clò (born 1947), Italian politician and academic
- Clodovil Hernandes (1937–2009), Brazilian fashion designer, TV presenter and politician nicknamed Clô

== Other uses ==
- Campylobacter-like organism test, rapid test for the most common cause of gastric ulcer
- Chlorine monoxide, a chemical radical
- Clo the Cow, advertising mascot of Clover Stornetta Farms
- Hypochlorite ion (ClO^{−}), composed of chlorine and oxygen
- Unit of clothing insulation

== See also ==
- Cee Lo
