= Cieszkowy =

- Village
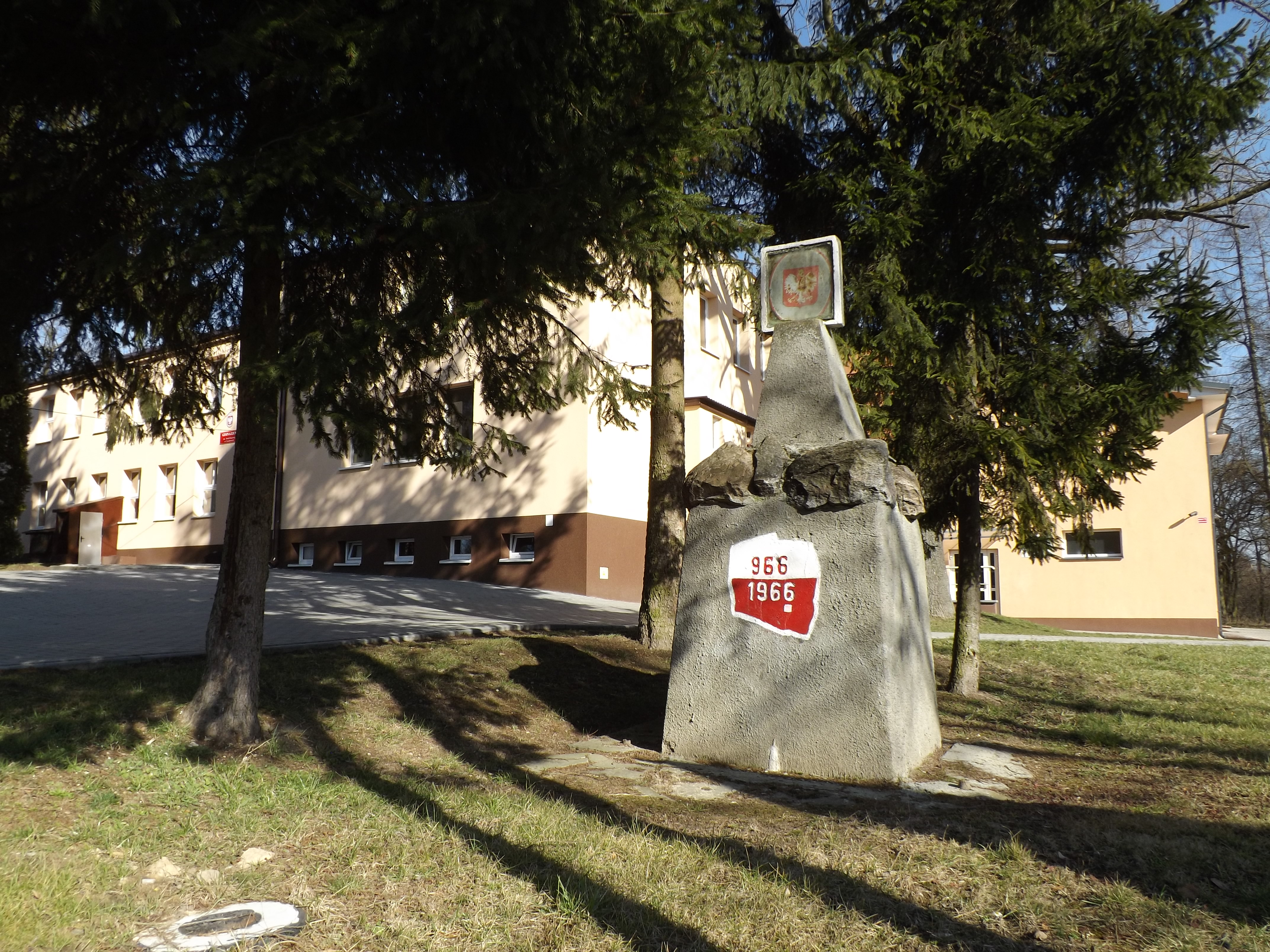
- Monument

- Location within Poland
- Coordinates: 50°20′N 20°32′E
- Country: Poland
- Voivodeship: Świętokrzyskie
- County: Kazimierza
- Gmina: Czarnocin
- Population: 250

Cieszkowy [t͡ɕɛʂˈkɔvɨ] is a village in the administrative district of Gmina Czarnocin, within Kazimierza County, Świętokrzyskie Voivodeship, in south-central Poland. It lies approximately 2 km (1 mi) south-east of Czarnocin, 8 km (5 mi) north-east of Kazimierza Wielka, and 62 km (39 mi) south of the regional capital Kielce.
