= Krzyż, Świętokrzyskie Voivodeship =

Krzyż
- Village
- Location within Poland
- Coordinates: 50°19′12″N 20°32′26″E
- Country: Poland
- Voivodeship: Świętokrzyskie
- County: Kazimierza
- Gmina: Czarnocin

Krzyż [kʂɨʂ] is a village in the administrative district of Gmina Czarnocin, within Kazimierza County, Świętokrzyskie Voivodeship, in south-central Poland. It lies approximately 4 km (2 mi) south-east of Czarnocin, 7 km (4 mi) north-east of Kazimierza Wielka, and 63 km (39 mi) south of the regional capital Kielce.
