= Dębiany, Kazimierza County =

Dębiany
- Village
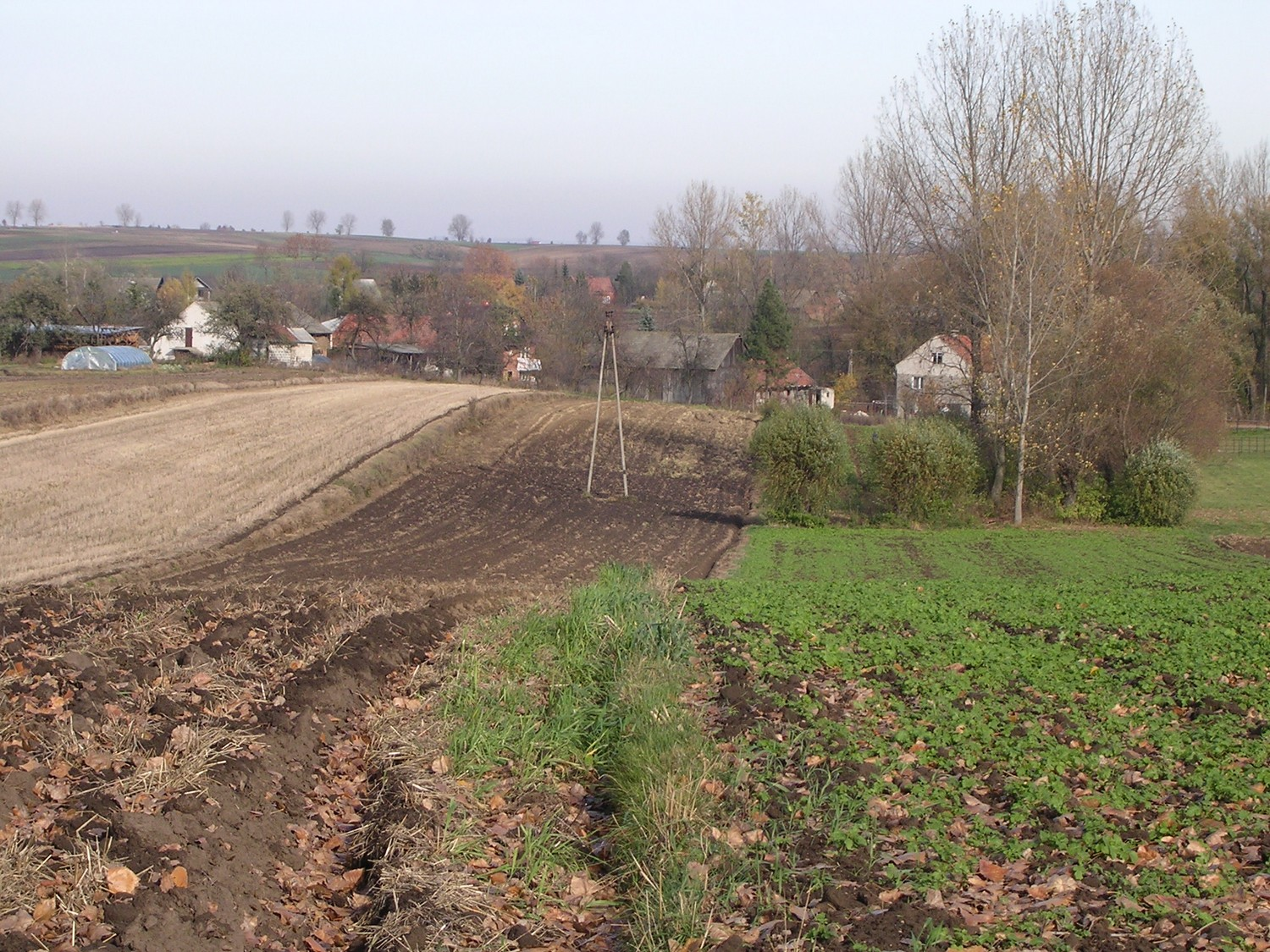

- Location within Poland
- Coordinates: 50°18′46″N 20°33′53″E
- Country: Poland
- Voivodeship: Świętokrzyskie
- County: Kazimierza
- Gmina: Czarnocin

Dębiany [dɛmˈbjanɨ] is a village in the administrative district of Gmina Czarnocin, within Kazimierza County, Świętokrzyskie Voivodeship, in south-central Poland. It lies approximately 5 km (3 mi) south-east of Czarnocin, 8 km (5 mi) north-east of Kazimierza Wielka, and 64 km (40 mi) south of the regional capital Kielce.
