= Koryto, Świętokrzyskie Voivodeship =

Koryto
- Village
- Location within Poland
- Coordinates: 50°19′32″N 20°29′16″E
- Country: Poland
- Voivodeship: Świętokrzyskie
- County: Kazimierza
- Gmina: Czarnocin

Koryto [kɔˈrɨtɔ] is a village in the administrative district of Gmina Czarnocin, within Kazimierza County, Świętokrzyskie Voivodeship, in south-central Poland. It lies approximately 4 km (2 mi) south-west of Czarnocin, 6 km (4 mi) north of Kazimierza Wielka, and 63 km (39 mi) south of the regional capital Kielce.
