= Zagajów, Kazimierza County =

Zagajów
- Village
- Location within Poland
- Coordinates: 50°17′44″N 20°34′34″E
- Country: Poland
- Voivodeship: Świętokrzyskie
- County: Kazimierza
- Gmina: Czarnocin

Zagajów [zaˈɡajuf] is a village in the administrative district of Gmina Czarnocin, within Kazimierza County, Świętokrzyskie Voivodeship, in south-central Poland. It lies approximately 7 km (4 mi) south-east of Czarnocin, 7 km (4 mi) east of Kazimierza Wielka, and 66 km (41 mi) south of the regional capital Kielce.
