= Malżyce =

- Village
- Location within Poland
- Coordinates: 50°22′3″N 20°29′44″E
- Country: Poland
- Voivodeship: Świętokrzyskie
- County: Kazimierza
- Gmina: Czarnocin

Malżyce [malˈʐɨt͡sɛ] is a village in the administrative district of Gmina Czarnocin, within Kazimierza County, Świętokrzyskie Voivodeship, in south-central Poland. It lies approximately 4 km (2 mi) north-west of Czarnocin, 11 km (7 mi) north of Kazimierza Wielka, and 58 km (36 mi) south of the regional capital Kielce. As of 2011, the village had 93 males and 73 females, for a total population of 169 people.
