= Mikołajów, Kazimierza County =

Mikołajów
- Village
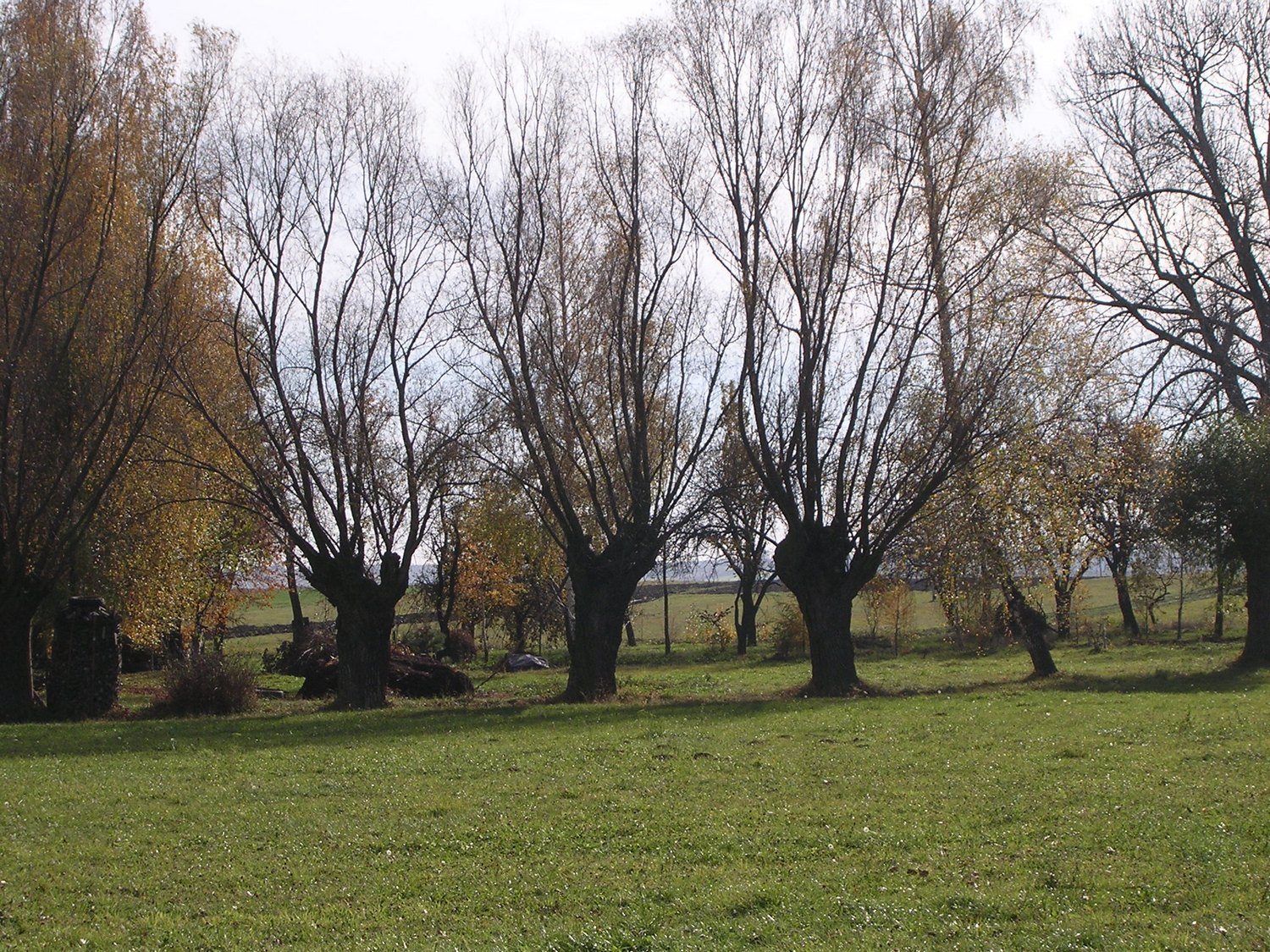

- Location within Poland
- Coordinates: 50°17′56″N 20°35′31″E
- Country: Poland
- Voivodeship: Świętokrzyskie
- County: Kazimierza
- Gmina: Czarnocin

Mikołajów [mikɔˈwajuf] is a village in the administrative district of Gmina Czarnocin, within Kazimierza County, Świętokrzyskie Voivodeship, in south-central Poland. It lies approximately 8 km (5 mi) south-east of Czarnocin, 9 km (6 mi) east of Kazimierza Wielka, and 65 km (40 mi) south of the regional capital Kielce.
