= Będziaki =

- Village
- Location within Poland
- Coordinates: 50°19′N 20°35′E
- Country: Poland
- Voivodeship: Świętokrzyskie
- County: Kazimierza
- Gmina: Czarnocin

Będziaki [bɛnˈd͡ʑaki] is a village in the administrative district of Gmina Czarnocin, within Kazimierza County, Świętokrzyskie Voivodeship, in south-central Poland. It lies about 6 km (4 mi) south-east of Czarnocin, 9 km (6 mi) north-east of Kazimierza Wielka, and 63 km (39 mi) south of the regional capital Kielce.
