= Ciuślice =

- Village
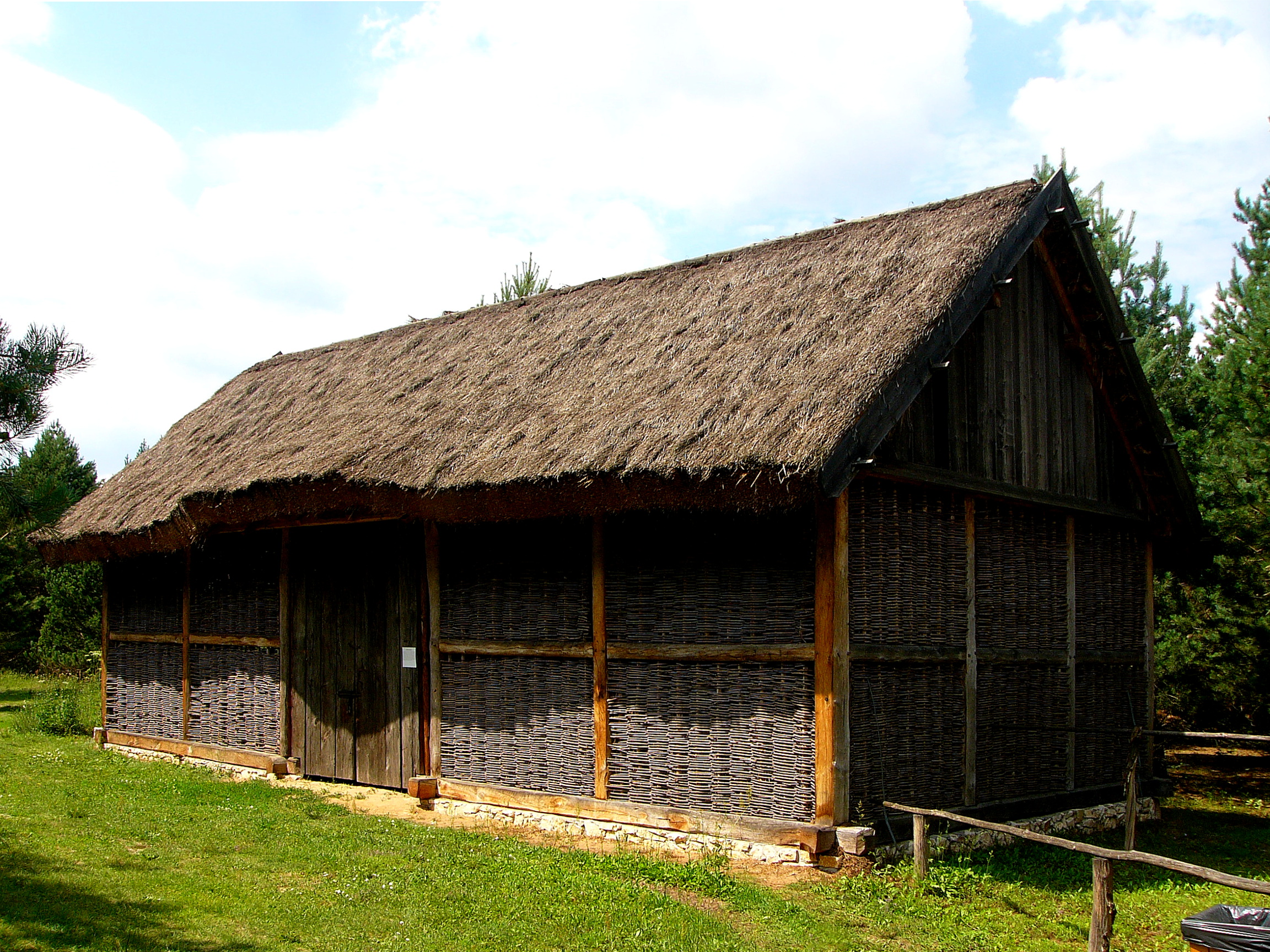

- Location within Poland
- Coordinates: 50°20′N 20°29′E
- Country: Poland
- Voivodeship: Świętokrzyskie
- County: Kazimierza
- Gmina: Czarnocin

Ciuślice [t͡ɕuˈɕlit͡sɛ] is a village in the administrative district of Gmina Czarnocin, within Kazimierza County, Świętokrzyskie Voivodeship, in south-central Poland. It lies about 3 km (2 mi) south-west of Czarnocin, 7 km (4 mi) north of Kazimierza Wielka, and 62 km (39 mi) south of the regional capital Kielce.
