= Soboszów =

- Village
- Location within Poland
- Coordinates: 50°20′N 20°34′E
- Country: Poland
- Voivodeship: Świętokrzyskie
- County: Kazimierza
- Gmina: Czarnocin

Soboszów [sɔˈbɔʂuf] is a village in the administrative district of Gmina Czarnocin, within Kazimierza County, Świętokrzyskie Voivodeship, in south-central Poland. It lies approximately 4 km (2 mi) east of Czarnocin, 9 km (6 mi) north-east of Kazimierza Wielka, and 62 km (39 mi) south of the regional capital Kielce.
