= Turnawiec =

- Village
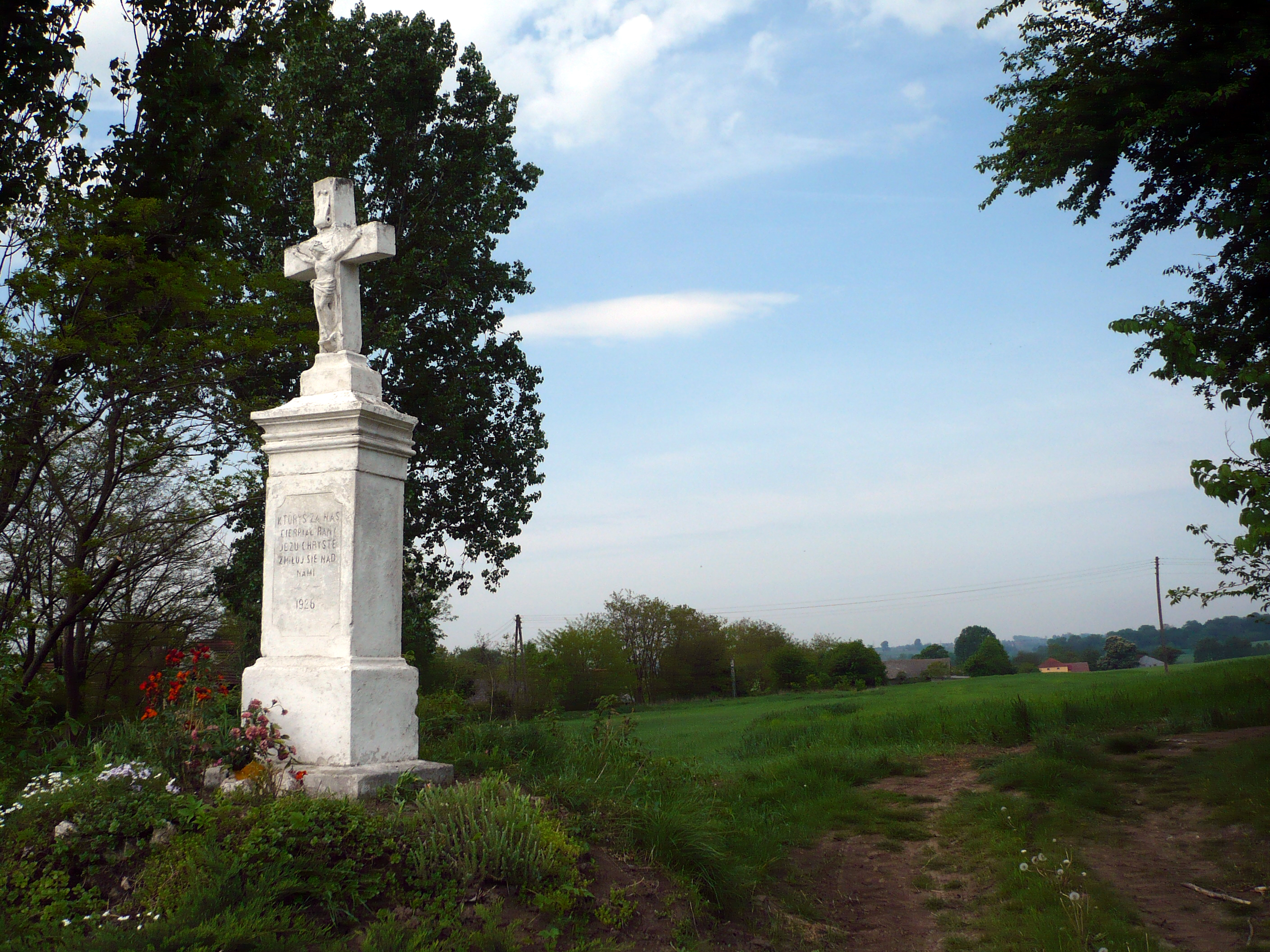
- Roadside cross

- Location within Poland
- Coordinates: 50°21′N 20°30′E
- Country: Poland
- Voivodeship: Świętokrzyskie
- County: Kazimierza
- Gmina: Czarnocin

Turnawiec [turˈnavjɛt͡s] is a village, in the administrative district of Gmina Czarnocin, within Kazimierza County, Świętokrzyskie Voivodeship, in south-central Poland. It lies approximately 2 km (1 mi) north-west of Czarnocin, 9 km (6 mi) north of Kazimierza Wielka, and 60 km (37 mi) south of the regional capital Kielce.
