= Opatkowiczki =

- Village
- Location within Poland
- Coordinates: 50°20′N 20°29′E
- Country: Poland
- Voivodeship: Świętokrzyskie
- County: Kazimierza
- Gmina: Czarnocin

Opatkowiczki [ɔpatkɔˈvit͡ʂki] is a village in the administrative district of Gmina Czarnocin, within Kazimierza County, Świętokrzyskie Voivodeship, in south-central Poland. It lies approximately 3 km (2 mi) south-west of Czarnocin, 7 km (4 mi) north of Kazimierza Wielka, and 62 km (39 mi) south of the regional capital Kielce. As of 2011, the village had 70 males and 83 females, for a total population of 153 people.
