= Kolosy =

- Village
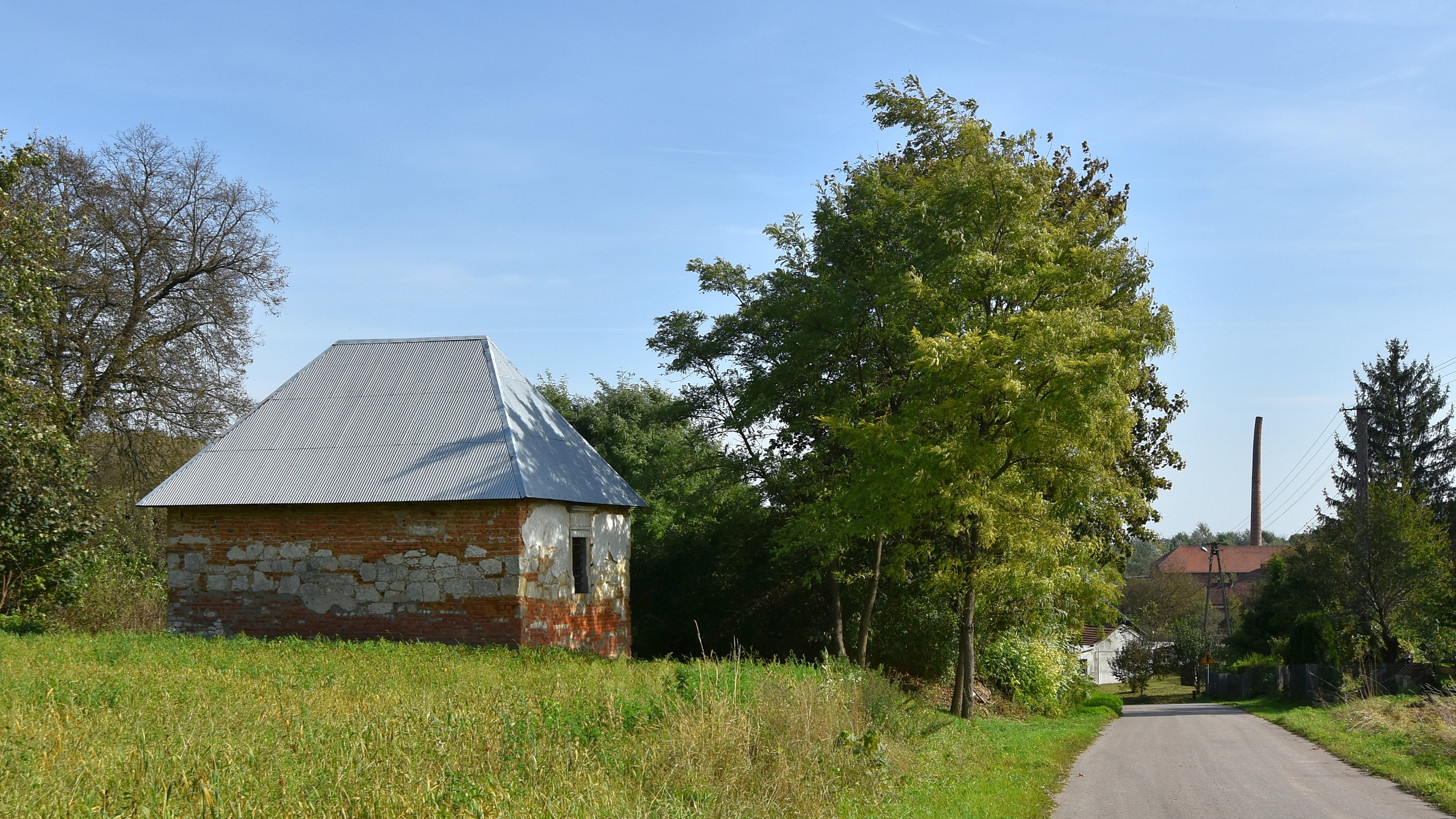

- Location within Poland
- Coordinates: 50°19′8″N 20°36′45″E
- Country: Poland
- Voivodeship: Świętokrzyskie
- County: Kazimierza
- Gmina: Czarnocin
- Population (approx.): 500

Kolosy [kɔˈlɔsɨ] is a village in the administrative district of Gmina Czarnocin, within Kazimierza County, Świętokrzyskie Voivodeship, in south-central Poland. It lies approximately 8 km (5 mi) south-east of Czarnocin, 11 km (7 mi) north-east of Kazimierza Wielka, and 63 km (39 mi) south of the regional capital Kielce.
