= Stradów, Świętokrzyskie Voivodeship =

Stradów
- Village
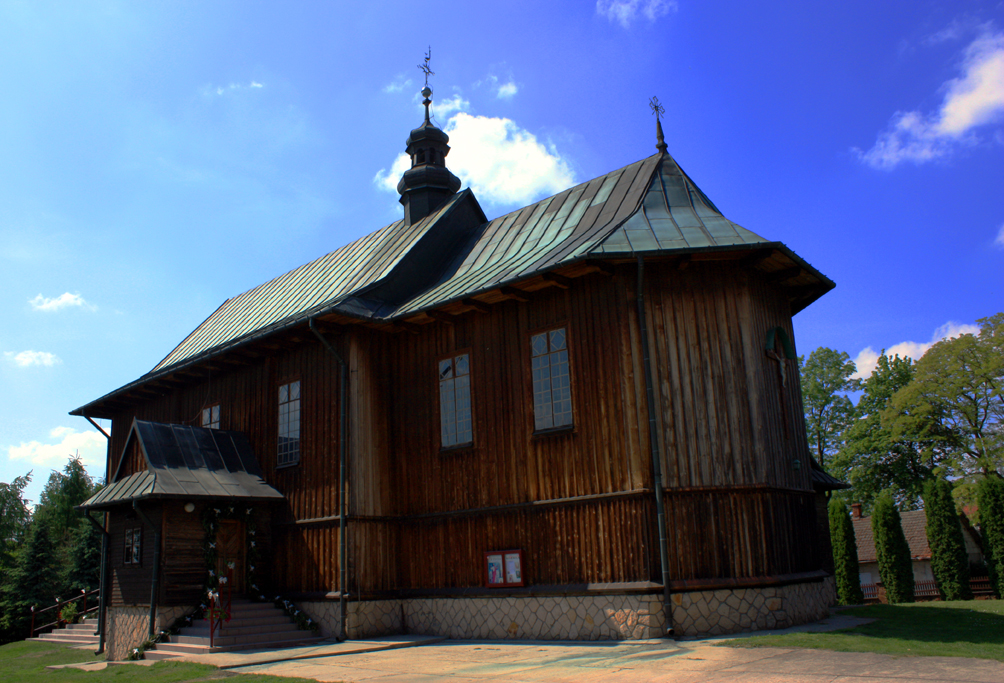
- St. Bartholomew's Church, Stradów

- Location within Poland
- Coordinates: 50°22′14″N 20°28′43″E
- Country: Poland
- Voivodeship: Świętokrzyskie
- County: Kazimierza
- Gmina: Czarnocin

Stradów [ˈstraduf] is a village in the administrative district of Gmina Czarnocin, within Kazimierza County, Świętokrzyskie Voivodeship, in south-central Poland. It lies in historic Lesser Poland, approximately 5 km (3 mi) north-west of Czarnocin, 11 km (7 mi) north of Kazimierza Wielka, and 58 km (36 mi) south of the regional capital Kielce.

== History ==
In the Middle Ages, a large Slavic gord was located here. Altogether, the complex covered the area of some 25 hectares, and was among the largest of early Poland. The gord probably existed from the 8th to the 12th century, and was placed among hills, which provided defensive cover. Archaeologists found here traces of wooden houses, furnaces, and fortifications. The gord had a population of several hundred and it probably was an important administrative center of the region. Most likely, it belonged to the state of the Vistulans, and some time in the late 10th century, Stradów was seized by another Slavic tribe, the Polans. By the 12th century, the importance of Stradów diminished, as it was replaced by other local towns, seats of castellans, such as Wislica.

Central part of the gord of Stradów was the so-called Zamczysko, with the area of 1,5 hectares. It was surrounded by a rampart with a moat, which had the shape of a horseshoe. Next to Zamczysko there were subdivisions of the gord, now known as Miescisko and Barzynskie. They also were protected by a system of ramparts and moats. The size of the complex suggests that in case of danger, hundreds of local residents were able to find protection there.

Stradów also has a wooden church of St. Bartholomew the Apostle, which was founded in 1657 by Voivode of Kraków, Wladyslaw Myszkowski. It was built in the spot of an earlier church from 1326, which was burned down in 1656, during the Swedish invasion of Poland. In the 19th century, the church, which is famous for the painting of Our Lady of Stradów, was remodelled and expanded. Inside there is a stone baptismal font (17th century), several paintings (17th and 18th centuries), Baroque equipment and silver dress of Our Lady of Stradów (1879). Next to the church stands a wooded bell tower (1780).

During World War II, on January 11, 1945, a unit of the Home Army destroyed here a unit of the Wehrmacht, together with their Ukrainian collaborators.
