= Zagaje Stradowskie =

- Village
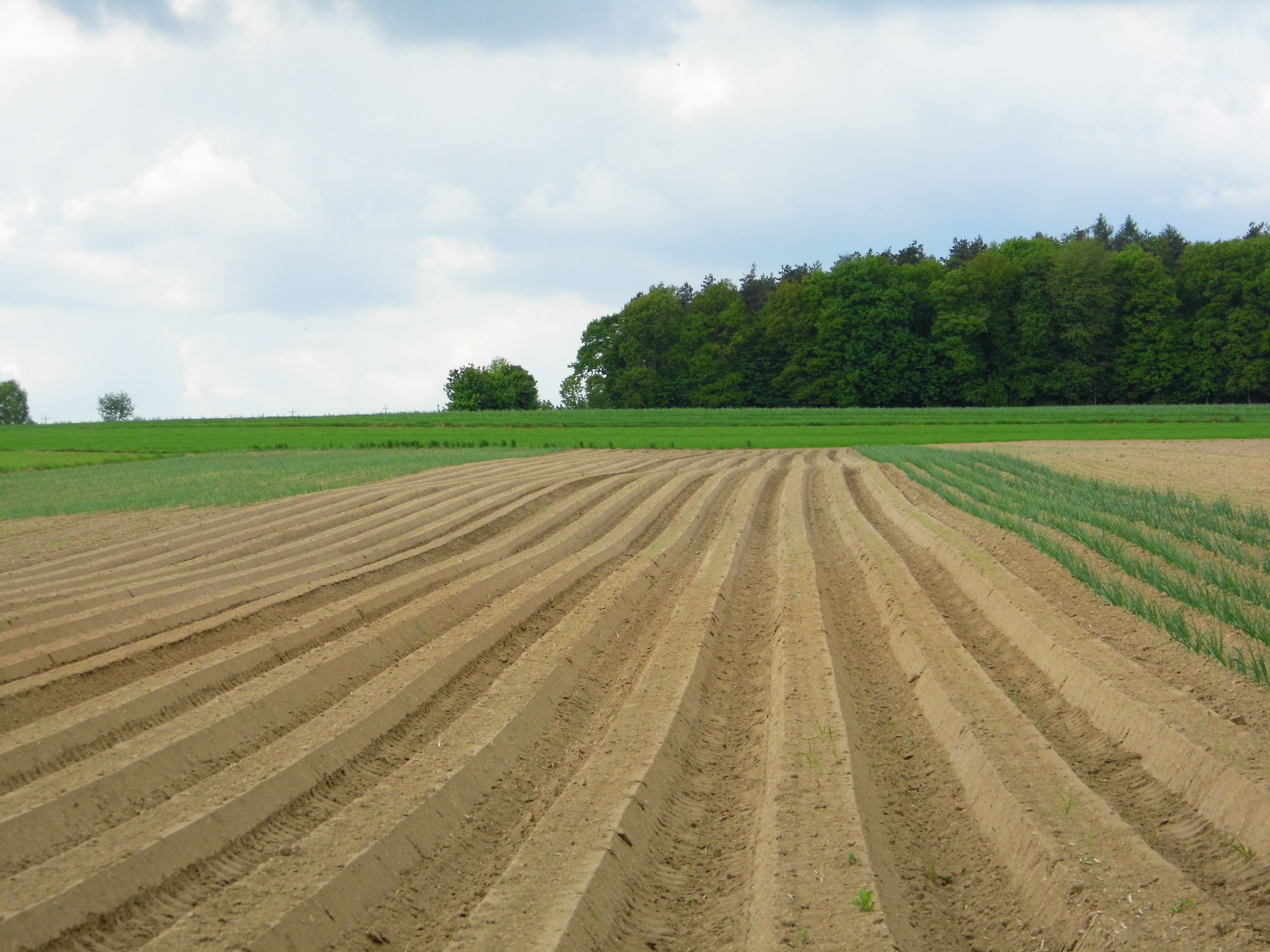

- Location within Poland
- Coordinates: 50°23′N 20°29′E
- Country: Poland
- Voivodeship: Świętokrzyskie
- County: Kazimierza
- Gmina: Czarnocin

Zagaje Stradowskie [zaˈɡajɛ straˈdɔfskʲɛ] is a village in the administrative district of Gmina Czarnocin, within Kazimierza County, Świętokrzyskie Voivodeship, in south-central Poland. It lies approximately 6 km (4 mi) north-west of Czarnocin, 13 km (8 mi) north of Kazimierza Wielka, and 57 km (35 mi) south of the regional capital Kielce.
