= Mękarzowice, Świętokrzyskie Voivodeship =

Mękarzowice
- Village
- Location within Poland
- Coordinates: 50°21′54″N 20°30′43″E
- Country: Poland
- Voivodeship: Świętokrzyskie
- County: Kazimierza
- Gmina: Czarnocin

Mękarzowice [mɛŋkaʐɔˈvit͡sɛ] is a village in the administrative district of Gmina Czarnocin, within Kazimierza County, Świętokrzyskie Voivodeship, in south-central Poland. It lies approximately 3 km (2 mi) north of Czarnocin, 11 km (7 mi) north of Kazimierza Wielka, and 58 km (36 mi) south of the regional capital Kielce.
