= Bieglów =

- Village
- Location within Poland
- Coordinates: 50°21′19″N 20°26′48″E
- Country: Poland
- Voivodeship: Świętokrzyskie
- County: Kazimierza
- Gmina: Czarnocin

Bieglów [ˈbjɛɡluf] is a village in the administrative district of Gmina Czarnocin, within Kazimierza County, Świętokrzyskie Voivodeship, in south-central Poland. It lies about 6 km (4 mi) west of Czarnocin, 10 km (6 mi) north of Kazimierza Wielka, and 60 km (37 mi) south of the regional capital Kielce.
