= Stropieszyn, Świętokrzyskie Voivodeship =

Stropieszyn
- Village
- Location within Poland
- Coordinates: 50°18′N 20°36′E
- Country: Poland
- Voivodeship: Świętokrzyskie
- County: Kazimierza
- Gmina: Czarnocin

Stropieszyn [strɔˈpjɛʂɨn] is a village in the administrative district of Gmina Czarnocin, within Kazimierza County, Świętokrzyskie Voivodeship, in south-central Poland. It lies approximately 8 km (5 mi) south-east of Czarnocin, 9 km (6 mi) east of Kazimierza Wielka, and 65 km (40 mi) south of the regional capital Kielce.
