= Michałowice, Świętokrzyskie Voivodeship =

Michałowice
- Village
- Location within Poland
- Coordinates: 50°21′50″N 20°28′44″E
- Country: Poland
- Voivodeship: Świętokrzyskie
- County: Kazimierza
- Gmina: Czarnocin

Michałowice [mixawɔˈvit͡sɛ] is a village in the administrative district of Gmina Czarnocin, within Kazimierza County, Świętokrzyskie Voivodeship, in south-central Poland. It lies approximately 4 km (2 mi) north-west of Czarnocin, 11 km (7 mi) north of Kazimierza Wielka, and 59 km (37 mi) south of the regional capital Kielce.
