= Sokolina =

- Village
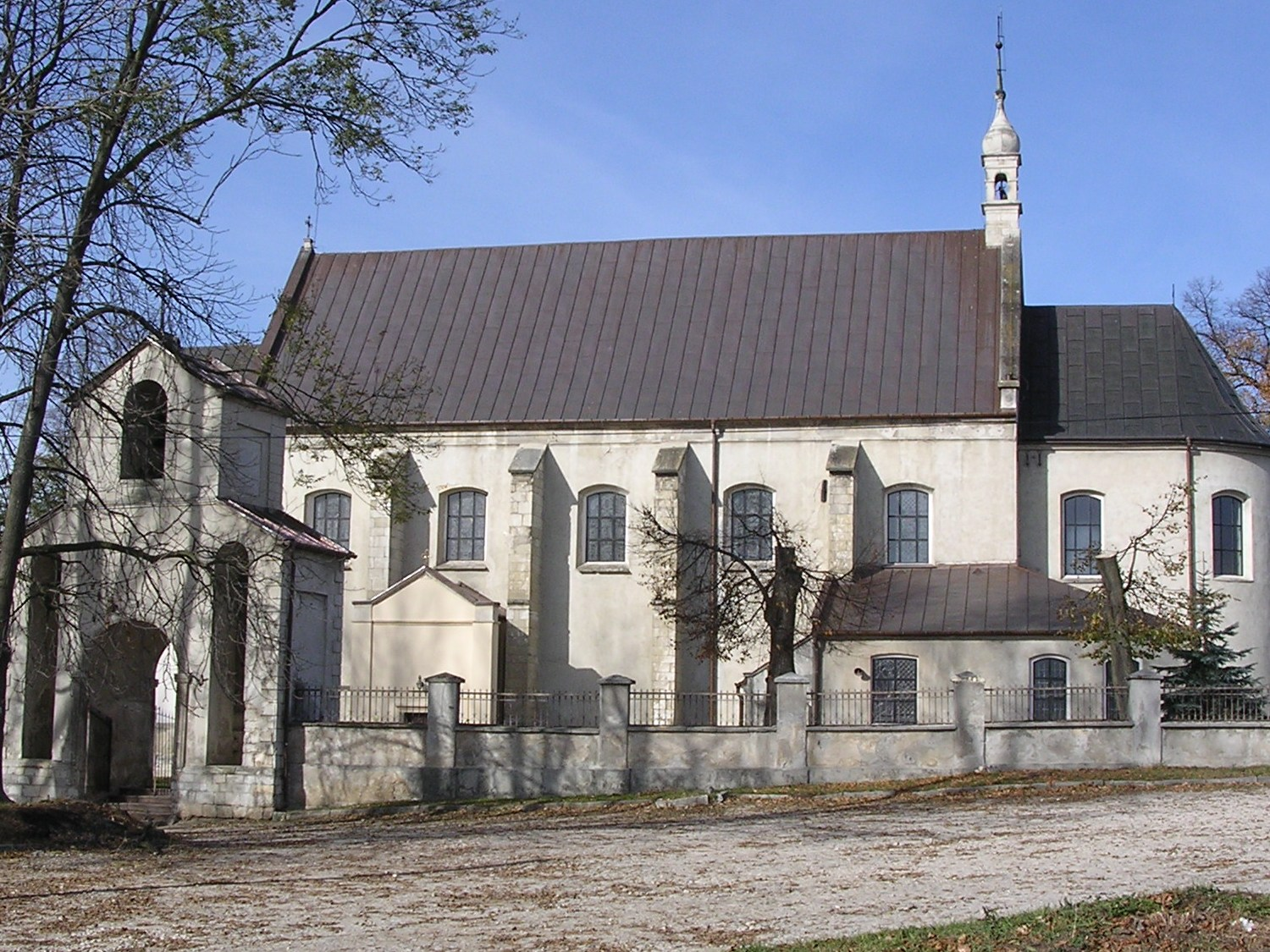
- Catholic church

- Location within Poland
- Coordinates: 50°18′N 20°37′E
- Country: Poland
- Voivodeship: Świętokrzyskie
- County: Kazimierza
- Gmina: Czarnocin

Sokolina [sɔkɔˈlina] is a village in the administrative district of Gmina Czarnocin, within Kazimierza County, Świętokrzyskie Voivodeship, in south-central Poland. It lies approximately 9 km (6 mi) south-east of Czarnocin, 10 km (6 mi) east of Kazimierza Wielka, and 65 km (40 mi) south of the regional capital Kielce.
