= Kazimierza Mała =

- Village
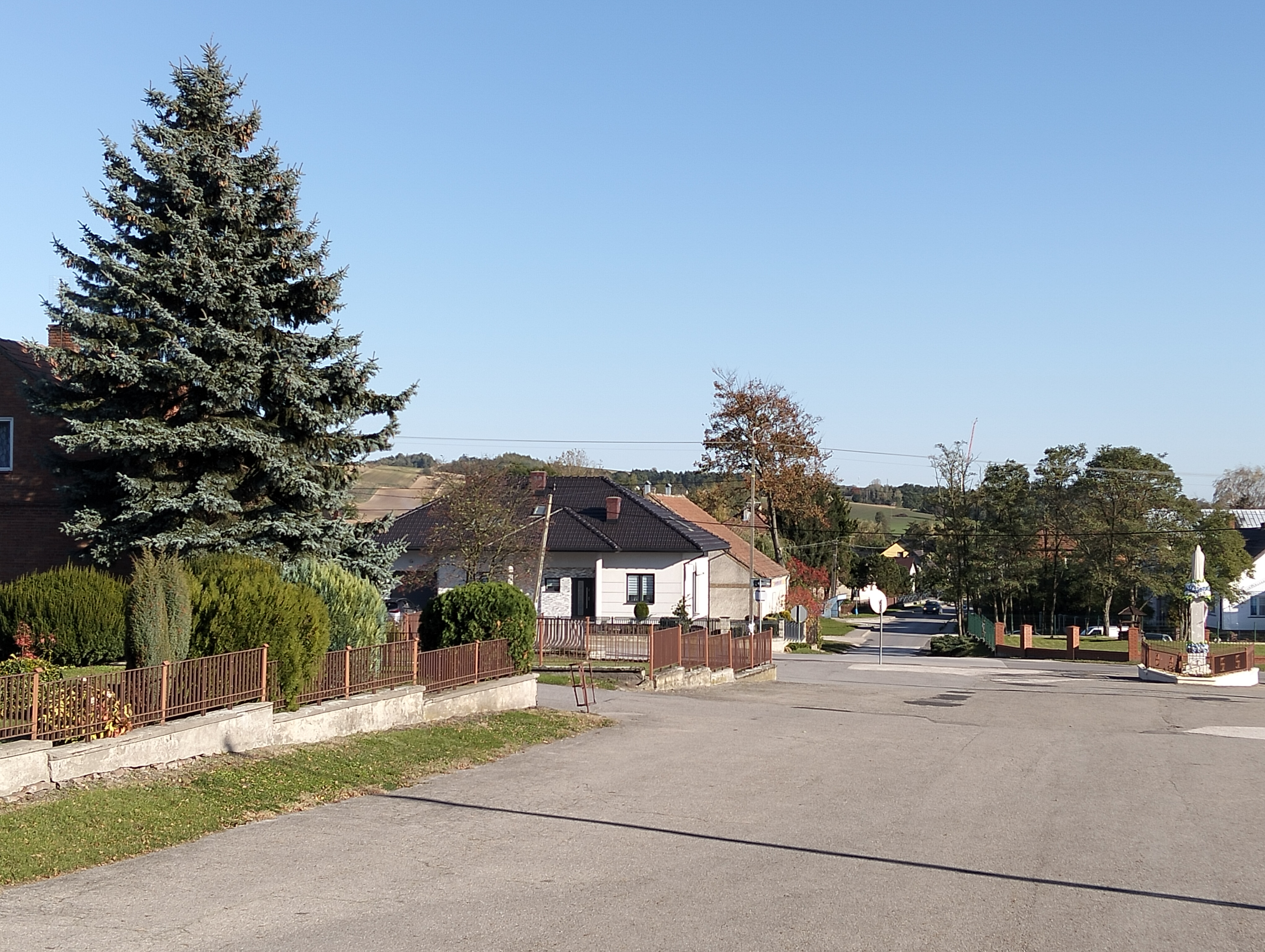

- Location within Poland
- Coordinates: 50°16′N 20°32′E
- Country: Poland
- Voivodeship: Świętokrzyskie
- County: Kazimierza
- Gmina: Kazimierza Wielka
- Population (approx.): 280

Kazimierza Mała [kaʑiˈmjɛʐa ˈmawa] is a village in the administrative district of Gmina Kazimierza Wielka, within Kazimierza County, Świętokrzyskie Voivodeship, in south-central Poland. It lies approximately 4 km (2 mi) east of Kazimierza Wielka and 69 km (43 mi) south of the regional capital Kielce.
