= Gabułtów =

- Village
- Location within Poland
- Coordinates: 50°17′7″N 20°32′0″E
- Country: Poland
- Voivodeship: Świętokrzyskie
- County: Kazimierza
- Gmina: Kazimierza Wielka

Gabułtów [ɡaˈbuu̯tuf] is a village in the administrative district of Gmina Kazimierza Wielka, within Kazimierza County, Świętokrzyskie Voivodeship, in south-central Poland. It lies approximately 4 km (2 mi) east of Kazimierza Wielka and 67 km (42 mi) south of the regional capital Kielce.
