= Paśmiechy =

- Village
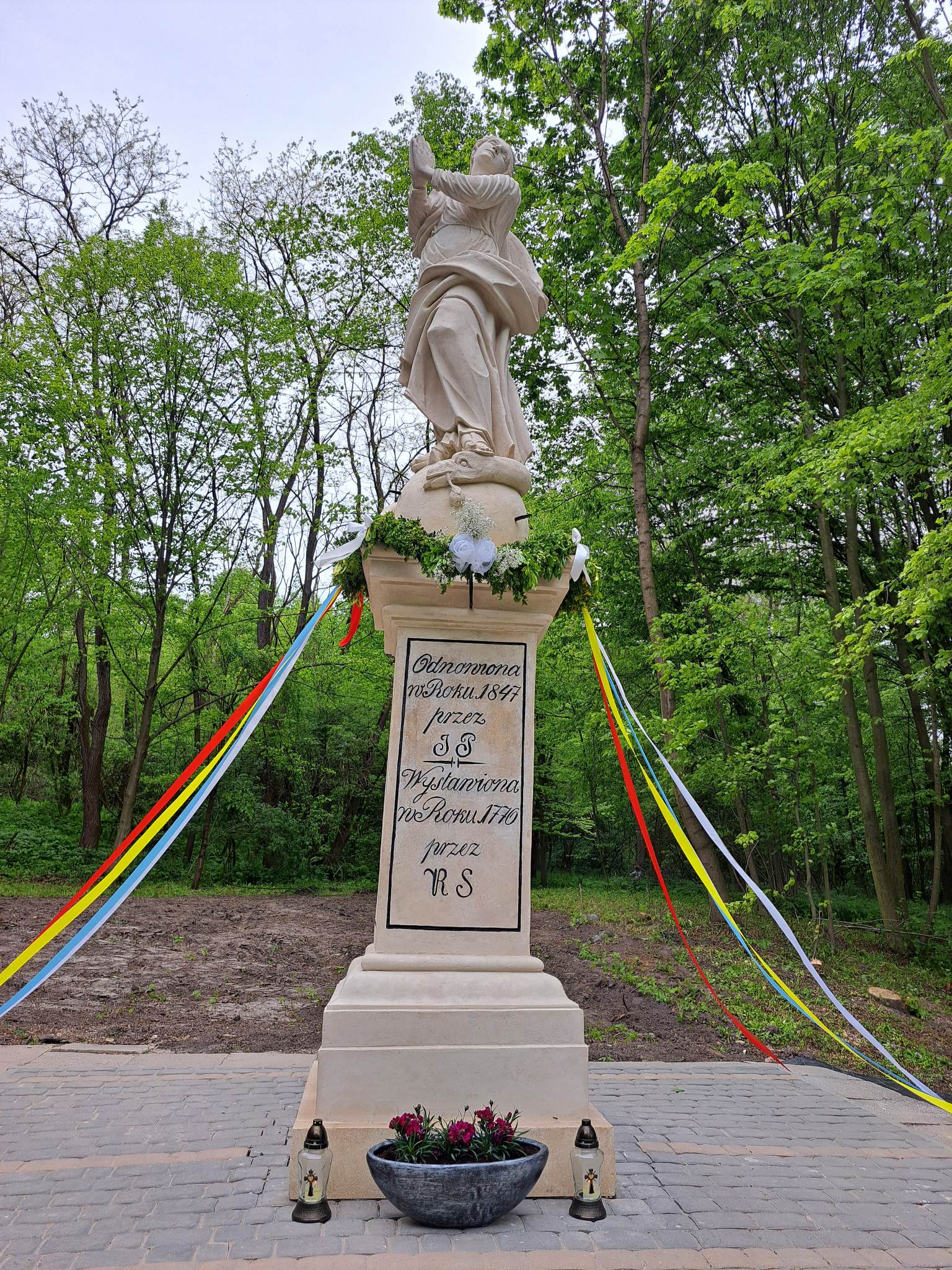

- Location within Poland
- Coordinates: 50°15′N 20°27′E
- Country: Poland
- Voivodeship: Świętokrzyskie
- County: Kazimierza
- Gmina: Kazimierza Wielka

Paśmiechy [paɕˈmjɛxɨ] is a village in the administrative district of Gmina Kazimierza Wielka, within Kazimierza County, Świętokrzyskie Voivodeship, in south-central Poland. It lies approximately 4 km (2 mi) south-west of Kazimierza Wielka and 72 km (45 mi) south of the regional capital Kielce. As of 2011, the village had 112 males and 99 females, for a total population of 211 people.
