= Wojciechów, Kazimierza County =

Wojciechów
- Village
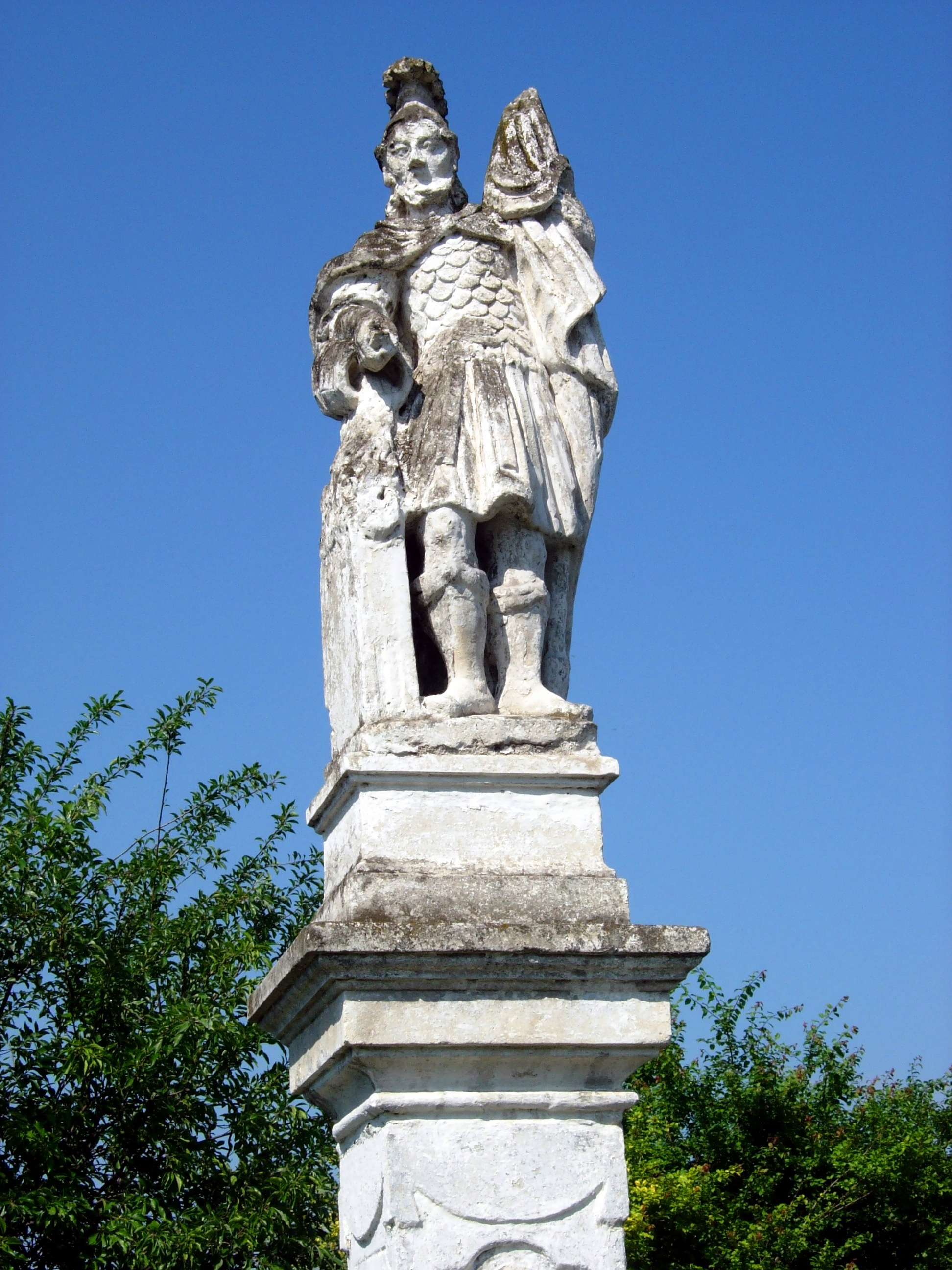

- Location within Poland
- Coordinates: 50°15′18″N 20°31′15″E
- Country: Poland
- Voivodeship: Świętokrzyskie
- County: Kazimierza
- Gmina: Kazimierza Wielka
- Population: 580

Wojciechów (Polish pronunciation: [vɔjˈt͡ɕɛxuf]) is a village in the administrative district of Gmina Kazimierza Wielka, within Kazimierza County, Świętokrzyskie Voivodeship, in south-central Poland. It lies approximately 4 km (2 mi) south-east of Kazimierza Wielka and 71 km (44 mi) south of the regional capital Kielce.
