= Boronice =

- Village
- Location within Poland
- Coordinates: 50°14′N 20°25′E
- Country: Poland
- Voivodeship: Świętokrzyskie
- County: Kazimierza
- Gmina: Kazimierza Wielka

Boronice [bɔrɔˈnit͡sɛ] is a village in the administrative district of Gmina Kazimierza Wielka, within Kazimierza County, Świętokrzyskie Voivodeship, in south-central Poland. It lies about 7 km (4 mi) south-west of Kazimierza Wielka and 74 km (46 mi) south of the regional capital Kielce.
