= Gunów-Kolonia =

- Village
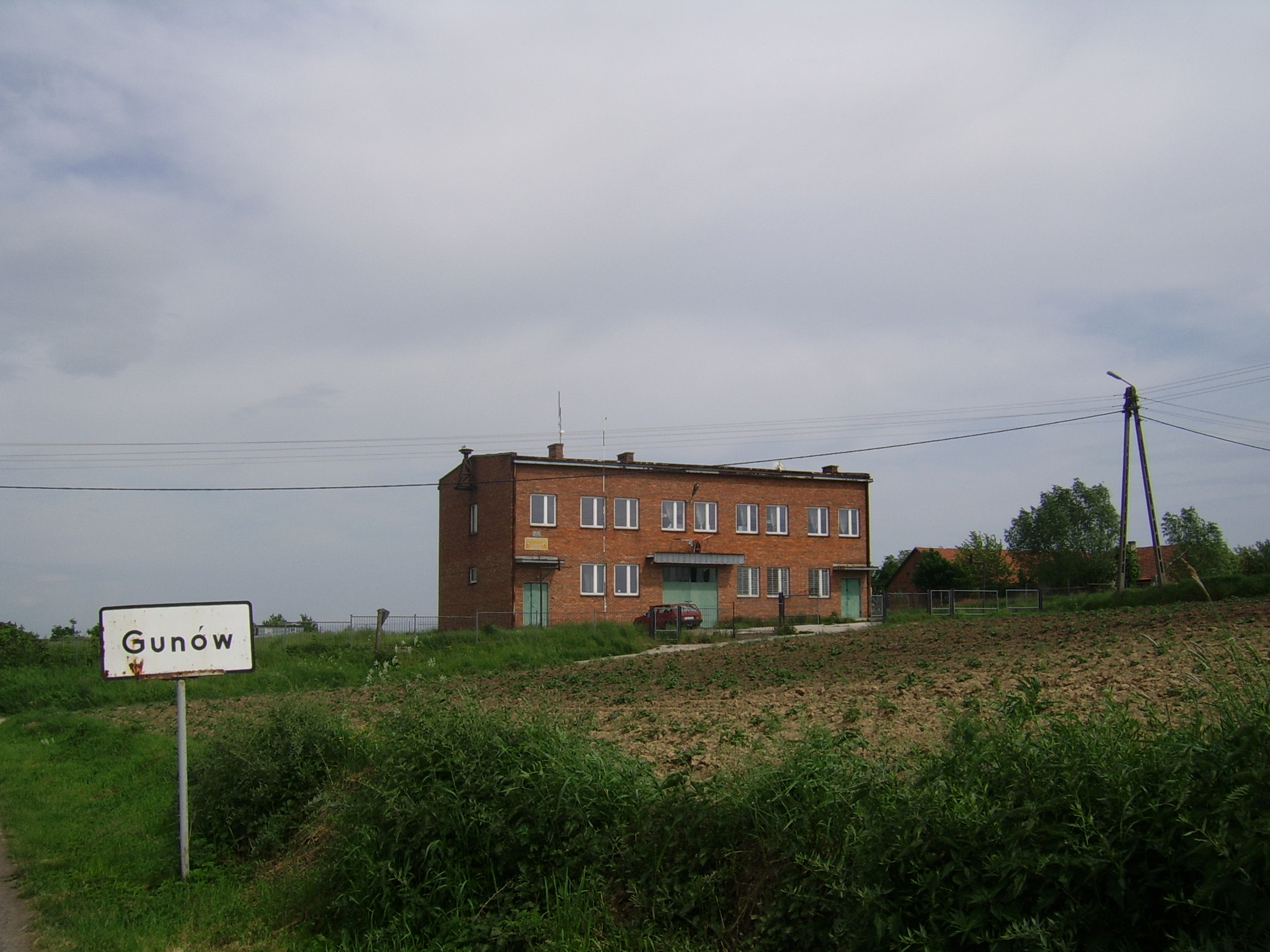

- Location within Poland
- Coordinates: 50°15′14″N 20°22′8″E
- Country: Poland
- Voivodeship: Świętokrzyskie
- County: Kazimierza
- Gmina: Kazimierza Wielka

Gunów-Kolonia [ˈɡunuf kɔˈlɔɲa] is a village in the administrative district of Gmina Kazimierza Wielka, within Kazimierza County, Świętokrzyskie Voivodeship, in south-central Poland. It lies approximately 9 km (6 mi) west of Kazimierza Wielka and 72 km (45 mi) south of the regional capital Kielce.
