= Kamyszów =

- Village
- Location within Poland
- Coordinates: 50°18′18″N 20°28′46″E
- Country: Poland
- Voivodeship: Świętokrzyskie
- County: Kazimierza
- Gmina: Kazimierza Wielka

Kamyszów [kaˈmɨʂuf] is a village in the administrative district of Gmina Kazimierza Wielka, within Kazimierza County, Świętokrzyskie Voivodeship, in south-central Poland. It lies approximately 4 km (2 mi) north of Kazimierza Wielka and 65 km (40 mi) south of the regional capital Kielce.
