= Donatkowice =

- Village
- Location within Poland
- Coordinates: 50°13′N 20°32′E
- Country: Poland
- Voivodeship: Świętokrzyskie
- County: Kazimierza
- Gmina: Kazimierza Wielka

Donatkowice [dɔnatkɔˈvit͡sɛ] is a village in the administrative district of Gmina Kazimierza Wielka, within Kazimierza County, Świętokrzyskie Voivodeship, in south-central Poland. It lies approximately 8 km (5 mi) south-east of Kazimierza Wielka and 75 km (47 mi) south of the regional capital Kielce.
