= Sieradzice =

- Village
- Location within Poland
- Coordinates: 50°13′N 20°24′E
- Country: Poland
- Voivodeship: Świętokrzyskie
- County: Kazimierza
- Gmina: Kazimierza Wielka

Sieradzice [ɕɛraˈd͡ʑit͡sɛ] is a village in the administrative district of Gmina Kazimierza Wielka, within Kazimierza County, Świętokrzyskie Voivodeship, in south-central Poland. It lies approximately 9 km (6 mi) south-west of Kazimierza Wielka and 76 km (47 mi) south of the regional capital Kielce.
