= Nagórzanki =

- Village
- Location within Poland
- Coordinates: 50°13′22″N 20°29′8″E
- Country: Poland
- Voivodeship: Świętokrzyskie
- County: Kazimierza
- Gmina: Kazimierza Wielka

Nagórzanki [naɡuˈʐaŋki] is a village in the administrative district of Gmina Kazimierza Wielka, within Kazimierza County, Świętokrzyskie Voivodeship, in south-central Poland. It is located approximately 6 km (4 mi) south of Kazimierza Wielka, and 74 km (46 mi) south of the regional capital Kielce.
