= Zięblice =

- Village
- Location within Poland
- Coordinates: 50°18′N 20°34′E
- Country: Poland
- Voivodeship: Świętokrzyskie
- County: Kazimierza
- Gmina: Kazimierza Wielka

Zięblice [ʑɛmˈblit͡sɛ] is a village in the administrative district of Gmina Kazimierza Wielka, within Kazimierza County, Świętokrzyskie Voivodeship, in south-central Poland. It lies approximately 7 km (4 mi) north-east of Kazimierza Wielka and 65 km (40 mi) south of the regional capital Kielce.
