= Hołdowiec =

- Village
- Location within Poland
- Coordinates: 50°17′N 20°30′E
- Country: Poland
- Voivodeship: Świętokrzyskie
- County: Kazimierza
- Gmina: Kazimierza Wielka

Hołdowiec [xɔu̯ˈdɔvjɛt͡s] is a village in the administrative district of Gmina Kazimierza Wielka, within Kazimierza County, Świętokrzyskie Voivodeship, in south-central Poland. It lies approximately 2 km (1 mi) north-east of Kazimierza Wielka and 68 km (42 mi) south of the regional capital Kielce.
