= Zagórzyce, Kazimierza County =

Zagórzyce
- Village
- Location within Poland
- Coordinates: 50°16′33″N 20°33′33″E
- Country: Poland
- Voivodeship: Świętokrzyskie
- County: Kazimierza
- Gmina: Kazimierza Wielka

Zagórzyce [zaɡuˈʐɨt͡sɛ] is a village in the administrative district of Gmina Kazimierza Wielka, within Kazimierza County, Świętokrzyskie Voivodeship, in south-central Poland. It lies approximately 6 km (4 mi) east of Kazimierza Wielka and 68 km (42 mi) south of the regional capital Kielce.

== Population ==
Year	Residents
1998	248
2002	218
2009	227
2011	226
2021	224
