= Gorzków, Kazimierza County =

Gorzków
- Village
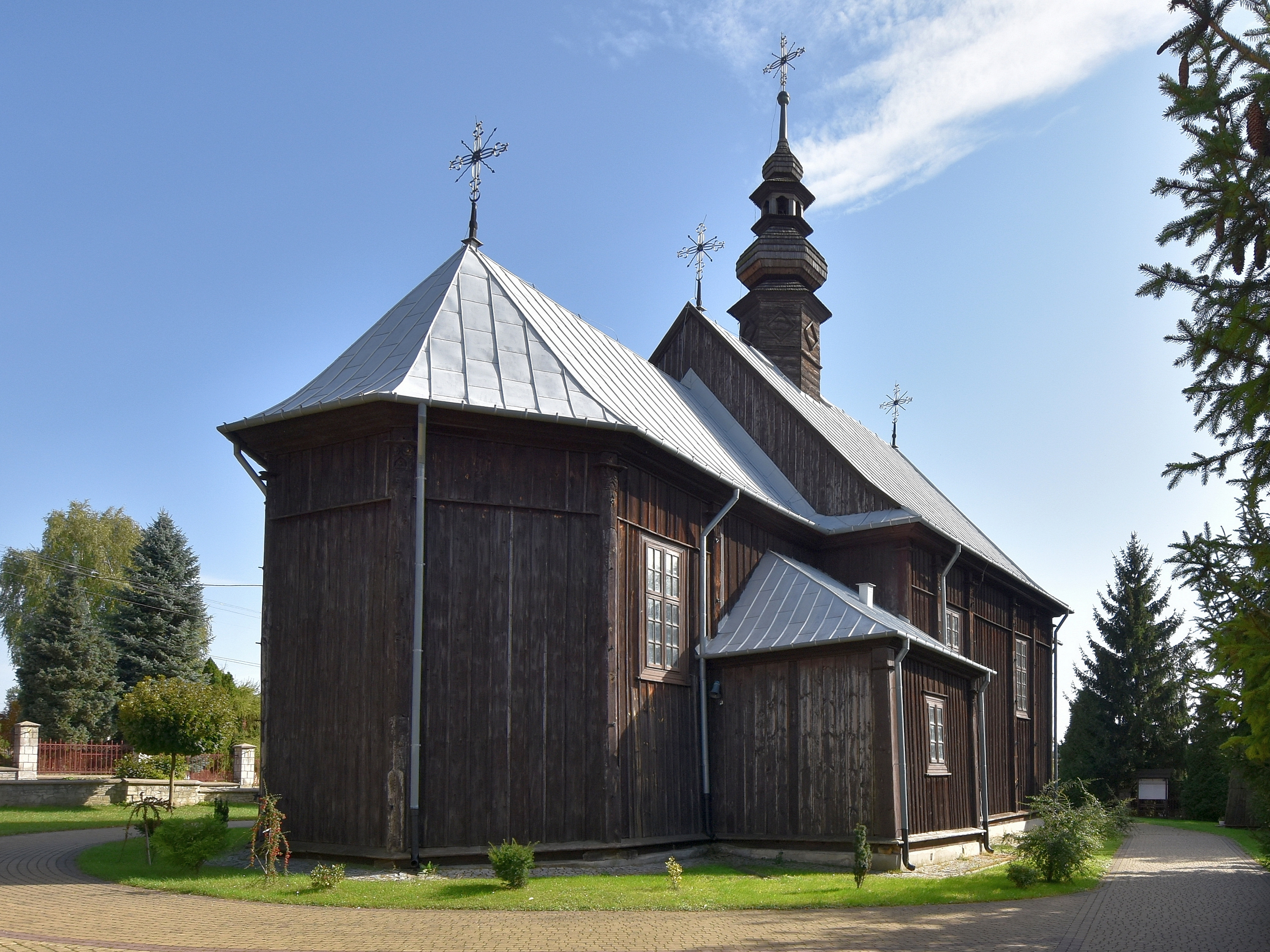
- Catholic church

- Location within Poland
- Coordinates: 50°13′22″N 20°30′23″E
- Country: Poland
- Voivodeship: Świętokrzyskie
- County: Kazimierza
- Gmina: Kazimierza Wielka

Gorzków [ˈɡɔʂkuf] is a village in the administrative district of Gmina Kazimierza Wielka, within Kazimierza County, Świętokrzyskie Voivodeship, in south-central Poland. It lies approximately 6 km (4 mi) south of Kazimierza Wielka and 74 km (46 mi) south of the regional capital Kielce.
