= Gunów-Wilków =

- Village
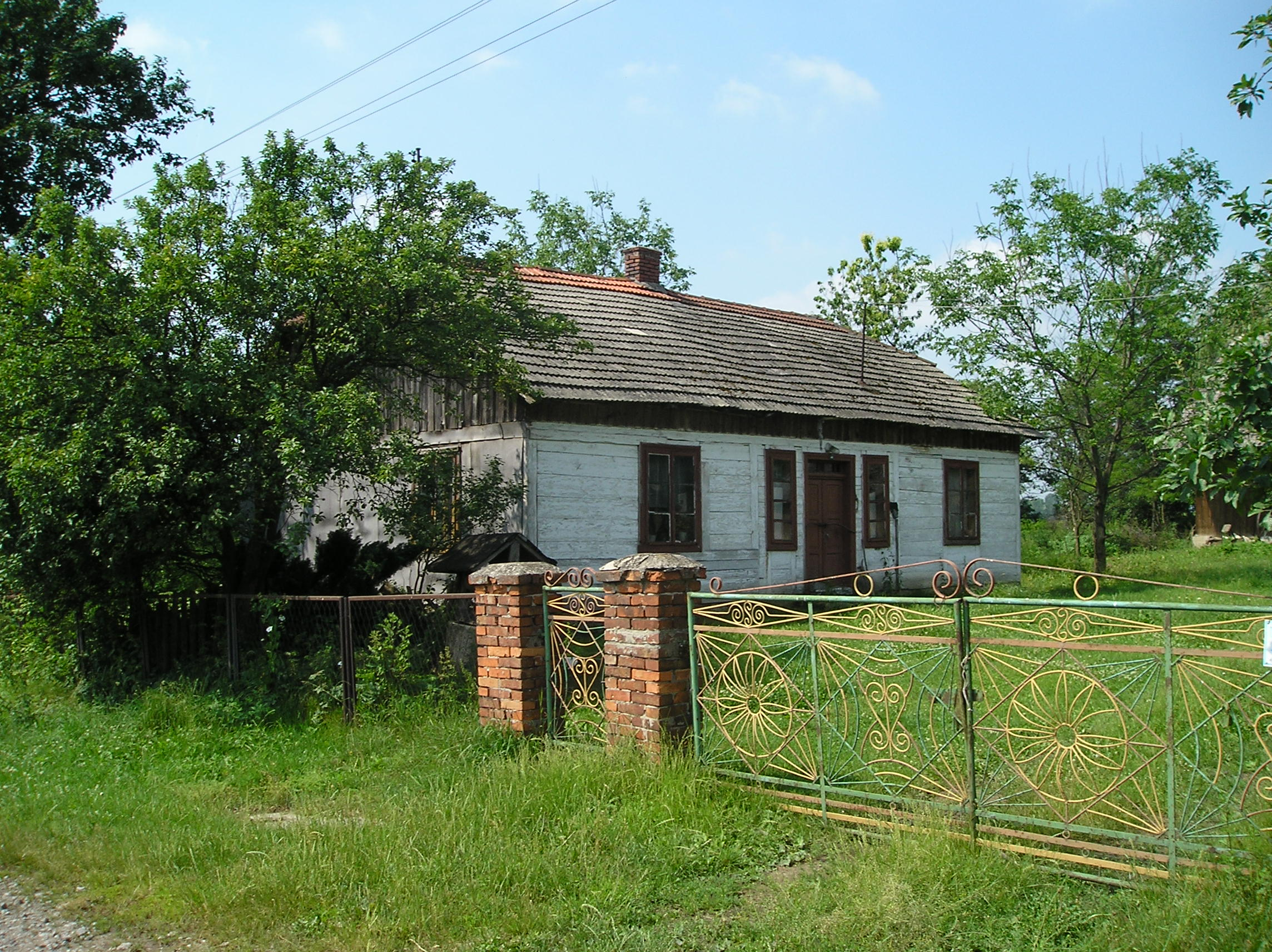

- Location within Poland
- Coordinates: 50°14′32″N 20°23′41″E
- Country: Poland
- Voivodeship: Świętokrzyskie
- County: Kazimierza
- Gmina: Kazimierza Wielka

Gunów-Wilków [ˈɡunuf ˈvilkuf] is a village in the administrative district of Gmina Kazimierza Wielka, within Kazimierza County, Świętokrzyskie Voivodeship, in south-central Poland. It lies approximately 8 km (5 mi) south-west of Kazimierza Wielka and 73 km (45 mi) south of the regional capital Kielce.
