= Krzyszkowice, Świętokrzyskie Voivodeship =

Krzyszkowice
- Village
- Location within Poland
- Coordinates: 50°12′33″N 20°28′10″E
- Country: Poland
- Voivodeship: Świętokrzyskie
- County: Kazimierza
- Gmina: Kazimierza Wielka

Krzyszkowice [kʂɨʂkɔˈvit͡sɛ] is a village in the administrative district of Gmina Kazimierza Wielka, within Kazimierza County, Świętokrzyskie Voivodeship, in south-central Poland. It lies approximately 8 km (5 mi) south of Kazimierza Wielka and 76 km (47 mi) south of the regional capital Kielce.
