= Swoszowice, Kazimierza County =

Swoszowice
- Village
- Location within Poland
- Coordinates: 50°19′N 20°32′E
- Country: Poland
- Voivodeship: Świętokrzyskie
- County: Kazimierza
- Gmina: Czarnocin

Swoszowice [sfɔʂɔˈvit͡sɛ] is a village in the administrative district of Gmina Czarnocin, within Kazimierza County, Świętokrzyskie Voivodeship, in south-central Poland. It lies approximately 4 km (2 mi) south of Czarnocin, 6 km (4 mi) north-east of Kazimierza Wielka, and 64 km (40 mi) south of the regional capital Kielce.
