= Dalechowice =

- Village
- Location within Poland
- Coordinates: 50°12′N 20°27′E
- Country: Poland
- Voivodeship: Świętokrzyskie
- County: Kazimierza
- Gmina: Kazimierza Wielka

Dalechowice [dalɛxɔˈvit͡sɛ] is a village in the administrative district of Gmina Kazimierza Wielka, within Kazimierza County, Świętokrzyskie Voivodeship, in south-central Poland. It lies approximately 9 km (6 mi) south of Kazimierza Wielka and 77 km (48 mi) south of the regional capital Kielce.
