= Lekszyce =

- Village
- Location within Poland
- Coordinates: 50°11′53″N 20°24′57″E
- Country: Poland
- Voivodeship: Świętokrzyskie
- County: Kazimierza
- Gmina: Kazimierza Wielka

Lekszyce [lɛkˈʂɨt͡sɛ] is a village in the administrative district of Gmina Kazimierza Wielka, within Kazimierza County, Świętokrzyskie Voivodeship, in south-central Poland. It lies approximately 10 km (6 mi) (6 mi) south-west of Kazimierza Wielka and 78 km (48 mi) south of the regional capital Kielce.
