= Skorczów =

- Village
- Location within Poland
- Coordinates: 50°15′N 20°27′E
- Country: Poland
- Voivodeship: Świętokrzyskie
- County: Kazimierza
- Gmina: Kazimierza Wielka

Skorczów [ˈskɔrt͡ʂuf] is a village in the administrative district of Gmina Kazimierza Wielka, within Kazimierza County, Świętokrzyskie Voivodeship, in south-central Poland. It lies approximately 4 km (2 mi) south-west of Kazimierza Wielka and 72 km (45 mi) south of the regional capital Kielce.
