= Chruszczyna Wielka =

- Village
- Location within Poland
- Coordinates: 50°14′9″N 20°28′56″E
- Country: Poland
- Voivodeship: Świętokrzyskie
- County: Kazimierza
- Gmina: Kazimierza Wielka
- Website: Chruszczyna Wielka

Chruszczyna Wielka [xruʂˈt͡ʂɨna ˈvjɛlka] is a village in the administrative district of Gmina Kazimierza Wielka, within Kazimierza County, Świętokrzyskie Voivodeship, in south-central Poland. It lies about 5 km (3 mi) south of Kazimierza Wielka and 73 km (45 mi) south of the regional capital Kielce.
