= Wymysłów, Kazimierza County =

Wymysłów
- Village
- Location within Poland
- Coordinates: 50°16′00″N 20°34′00″E
- Country: Poland
- Voivodeship: Świętokrzyskie
- County: Kazimierza
- Gmina: Kazimierza Wielka

Wymysłów [vɨˈmɨswuf] is a village in the administrative district of Gmina Kazimierza Wielka, within Kazimierza County, Świętokrzyskie Voivodeship, in south-central Poland. It lies approximately 6 km (4 mi) east of Kazimierza Wielka and 69 km (43 mi) south of the regional capital Kielce.
