= Wojsławice =

Wojsławice may refer to the following places in Poland:

- Wojsławice, Lower Silesian Voivodeship (south-west Poland)
- Wojsławice, Lublin Voivodeship (east Poland)
- Wojsławice, Zduńska Wola County in Łódź Voivodeship (central Poland)
- Wojsławice, Kazimierza County in Świętokrzyskie Voivodeship (south-central Poland)
- Wojsławice, Pińczów County in Świętokrzyskie Voivodeship (south-central Poland)
- Wojsławice, Masovian Voivodeship (east-central Poland)
- Wojsławice, Silesian Voivodeship (south Poland)
- Wojsławice, Lubusz Voivodeship (west Poland)
- Wojsławice, Opole Voivodeship (south-west Poland)
- Wojsławice, West Pomeranian Voivodeship (north-west Poland)
