= Broniszów =

Broniszów may refer to the following places:

- Broniszów, Lubusz Voivodeship (west Poland)
- Broniszów, Subcarpathian Voivodeship (south-east Poland)
- Broniszów, Świętokrzyskie Voivodeship (south-central Poland)
