= Plechówka =

- Village
- Location within Poland
- Coordinates: 50°13′50″N 20°30′29″E
- Country: Poland
- Voivodeship: Świętokrzyskie
- County: Kazimierza
- Gmina: Kazimierza Wielka

Plechówka [plɛˈxufka] is a village, in the administrative district of Gmina Kazimierza Wielka, within Kazimierza County, Świętokrzyskie Voivodeship, in south-central Poland.
