= Swoszowice =

Swoszowice may refer to the following places in Poland:

- Swoszowice, Kraków
- Swoszowice, Kazimierza County
