= Gmina Czarnocin, Świętokrzyskie Voivodeship =

Gmina Czarnocin Czarnocin Commune
- Gmina
- Coat of arms
- Interactive map of Gmina Czarnocin
- Coordinates (Czarnocin): 50°20′40″N 20°31′10″E
- Country: Poland
- Voivodeship: Świętokrzyskie
- County: Kazimierza
- Seat: Czarnocin

Area
  - Total: 69.53 km^{2} (26.85 sq mi)

Population (2006)
  - Total: 4,176
  - Density: 60.06/km^{2} (155.6/sq mi)

Gmina Czarnocin is a rural gmina (administrative district) in Kazimierza County, Świętokrzyskie Voivodeship, in south-central Poland. Its seat is the village of Czarnocin, which lies approximately 9 kilometres (6 mi) north of Kazimierza Wielka and 61 km (38 mi) south of the regional capital Kielce.

The gmina covers an area of 69.53 square kilometres (26.8 sq mi), and as of 2006 its total population is 4,176.

The gmina contains part of the protected area called Kozubów Landscape Park.

== Villages ==
Gmina Czarnocin contains the villages and settlements of Będziaki, Bieglów, Charzowice, Cieszkowy, Ciuślice, Czarnocin, Dębiany, Kolosy, Koryto, Krzyż, Malżyce, Mękarzowice, Michałowice, Mikołajów, Miławczyce, Opatkowiczki, Soboszów, Sokolina, Stradów, Stropieszyn, Swoszowice, Turnawiec, Zagaje Stradowskie and Zagajów.

== Neighbouring gminas ==
Gmina Czarnocin is bordered by the gminas of Działoszyce, Kazimierza Wielka, Opatowiec, Pińczów, Skalbmierz, Wiślica and Złota.
