= Podolany =

Podolany may refer to the following places in Poland:

- Podolany, Poznań, part of the Jeżyce district of Poznań
- Podolany, Lower Silesian Voivodeship (south-west Poland)
- Podolany, Podlaskie Voivodeship (north-east Poland)
- Podolany, Wadowice County in Lesser Poland Voivodeship (south Poland)
- Podolany, Wieliczka County in Lesser Poland Voivodeship (south Poland)
- Podolany, Świętokrzyskie Voivodeship (south-central Poland)
- Podolany, Masovian Voivodeship (east-central Poland)
