= Wielgus, Poland =

Wielgus
- Village
- Location within Poland
- Coordinates: 50°14′N 20°28′E
- Country: Poland
- Voivodeship: Świętokrzyskie
- County: Kazimierza
- Gmina: Kazimierza Wielka

Wielgus [ˈvjɛlɡus] is a village in the administrative district of Gmina Kazimierza Wielka, within Kazimierza County, Świętokrzyskie Voivodeship, in south-central Poland. It lies approximately 5 km (3 mi) south of Kazimierza Wielka and 73 km (45 mi) south of the regional capital Kielce.
