= Cło, Świętokrzyskie Voivodeship =

Cło
- Village
- Location within Poland
- Coordinates: 50°15′6″N 20°33′5″E
- Country: Poland
- Voivodeship: Świętokrzyskie
- County: Kazimierza
- Gmina: Kazimierza Wielka

Cło [t͡swɔ] is a village in the administrative district of Gmina Kazimierza Wielka, within Kazimierza County, Świętokrzyskie Voivodeship, in south-central Poland. It lies approximately 6 km (4 mi) south-east of Kazimierza Wielka and 71 km (44 mi) south of the regional capital Kielce.
