= Słonowice =

Słonowice may refer to the following places:

- Słonowice, Pomeranian Voivodeship (north Poland)
- Słonowice, Świętokrzyskie Voivodeship (south-central Poland)
- Słonowice, West Pomeranian Voivodeship (north-west Poland)
