= Łękawa, Świętokrzyskie Voivodeship =

Village in Gmina Kazimierza Wielka, Poland

Łękawa
- Village
- Location within Poland
- Coordinates: 50°13′01″N 20°26′19″E
- Country: Poland
- Voivodeship: Świętokrzyskie
- County: Kazimierza
- Gmina: Kazimierza Wielka

Łękawa [wɛnˈkava] is a village in the administrative district of Gmina Kazimierza Wielka, within Kazimierza County, Świętokrzyskie Voivodeship, in south-central Poland.
