= Wielgus (disambiguation) =

Stanisław Wielgus (born 1939) is a former Roman Catholic archbishop of Warsaw.

Wielgus may also refer to:

- Wielgus, Poland, a village in Kazimierza County, Świętokrzyskie Voivodeship
- Joanna Scheuring-Wielgus (born 1972), Polish politician
- Marek Wielgus (1950–1996), Polish politician
