= Słonowice, Świętokrzyskie Voivodeship =

Słonowice
- Village
- Location within Poland
- Coordinates: 50°16′4″N 20°27′3″E
- Country: Poland
- Voivodeship: Świętokrzyskie
- County: Kazimierza
- Gmina: Kazimierza Wielka

Słonowice [swɔnɔˈvit͡sɛ] is a village in the administrative district of Gmina Kazimierza Wielka, within Kazimierza County, Świętokrzyskie Voivodeship, in south-central Poland. It lies approximately 3 km (2 mi) west of Kazimierza Wielka and 70 km (43 mi) south of the regional capital Kielce.
