= Jakuszowice =

- Village
- Location within Poland
- Coordinates: 50°16′16″N 20°30′27″E
- Country: Poland
- Voivodeship: Świętokrzyskie
- County: Kazimierza
- Gmina: Kazimierza Wielka

Jakuszowice [jakuʂɔˈvit͡sɛ] is a village in the administrative district of Gmina Kazimierza Wielka, within Kazimierza County, Świętokrzyskie Voivodeship, in south-central Poland. It lies approximately 2 km (1 mi) east of Kazimierza Wielka and 69 km (43 mi) south of the regional capital Kielce.
