= Magic sword pendant =

Objects of archaeological importance

Magic sword pendants are small round objects believed to have been attached to the sword hilts near which they are found. They are about 50–70 mm in diameter, sometimes spherical, sometimes flat, sometimes hemispherical. Magic sword pendants are usually made of glass or semi-precious stone (e.g. jade, chalcedony, jet or rock crystal). There are also objects made of amber. T

These objects were used from the 2nd century to the 5th century AD, until the so-called Merovingian period. The area in which they are found stretches from Western and Northern Europe to Western Siberia. Magic sword pendants were probably produced at Roman sites and in the environment of the Sarmatians and the Huns.

Examples of finds include:

- From Barbaricum: Tiszalok, Dura-Europos, Vimose, Illerup, Thorsberg.
- From Poland: Dobrodzień-Rędzina, Żerniki Wielkie, Dobieszewice; the most famous find was uncovered in Jakuszowice in a princely grave.

Jakuszowice is a village located in southern Poland about 50 km northeast from Cracow. In 1911 people found a grave of a young man there, which was dated to the 5th century AD. In this grave, the following artifacts were found: a sword, a reflective arch, fittings and a belt buckle, horse harness and circle magic sword pendants made of amber with almandine mounted on top of it and set in gold binding. The buried man could have been a person belonging to the elite, because of rich equipment of the grave. He may have been connected with Huns, which is suggested by a reflective arch motive of gold foil, characteristic of Huns’ graves.

== Sources ==
- Biborski M., Kaczanowski P. (2013) Magic sword pendants, (w) Istvánovitsa E., Kulcsár V. (red.), Jamé, Nyíregyháza, 423-430.
- Kaczanowski P., (1998) Obraz kulturowy okresu wpływów rzymskich i wczesnej fazy okresu wędrówek ludów na ziemiach polskich i terenach ościennych, (w) Pieszczachowicz J. (red.) Wielka Historia Polski, t. I, Kraków, 279-314.
- Żółkowski S. (1991) Problematyka kontaktów ziem Polski z kręgiem kultury prowincjonalnorzymskiej w okresie wędrówek ludów, (w) Hensel W. (red.), Światowid XXXVIII, Warszawa, 63-117.
