= Głuchów, Świętokrzyskie Voivodeship =

Głuchów
- Village
- Location within Poland
- Coordinates: 50°16′2″N 20°23′13″E
- Country: Poland
- Voivodeship: Świętokrzyskie
- County: Kazimierza
- Gmina: Kazimierza Wielka

Głuchów [ˈɡwuxuf] is a village in the administrative district of Gmina Kazimierza Wielka, within Kazimierza County, Świętokrzyskie Voivodeship, in south-central Poland. It lies approximately 7 km (4 mi) west of Kazimierza Wielka and 71 km (44 mi) south of the regional capital Kielce.
