= Podolany, Świętokrzyskie Voivodeship =

Podolany
- Village
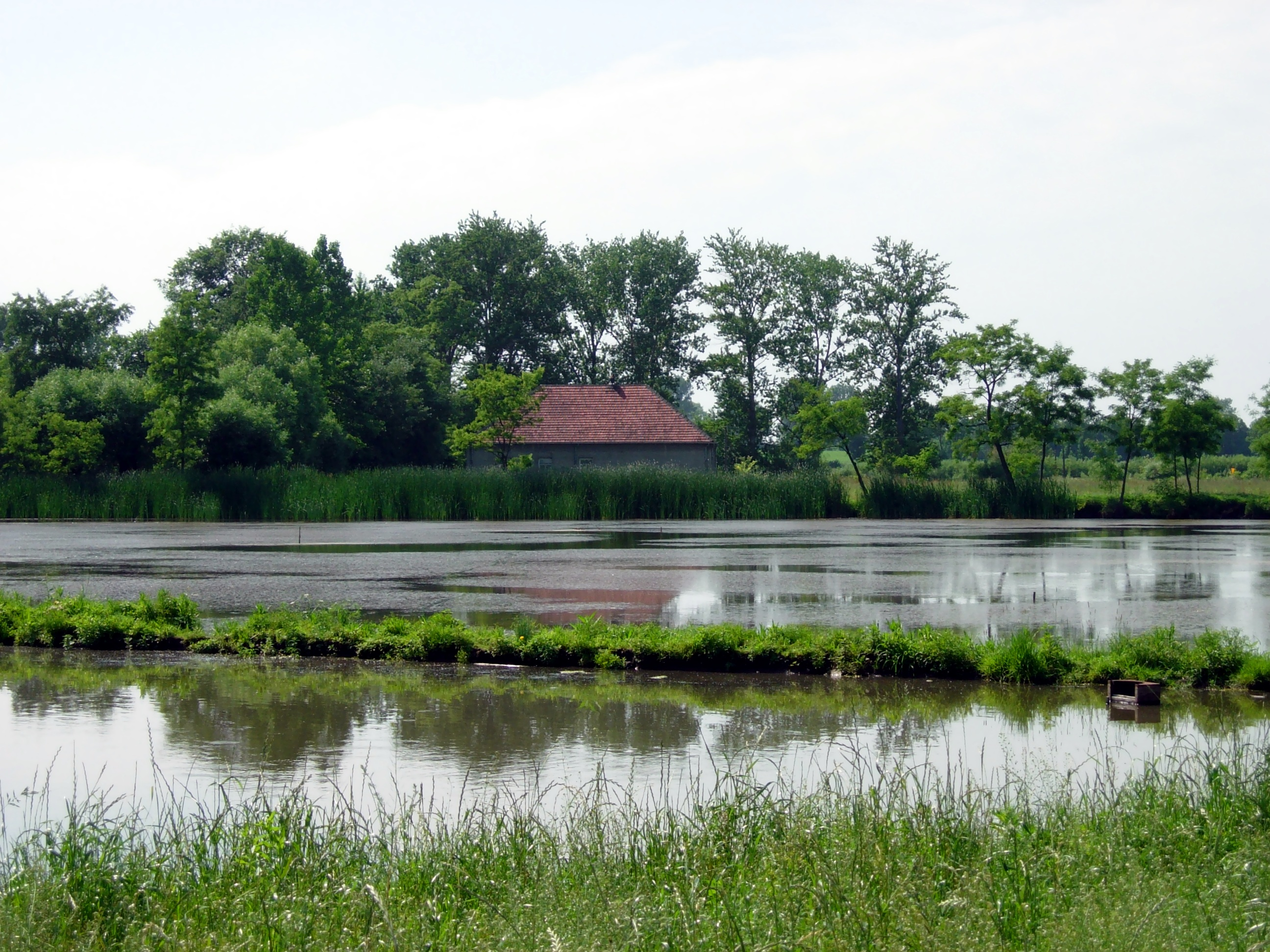

- Location within Poland
- Coordinates: 50°14′15″N 20°33′16″E
- Country: Poland
- Voivodeship: Świętokrzyskie
- County: Kazimierza
- Gmina: Kazimierza Wielka

Podolany [pɔdɔˈlanɨ] is a village in the administrative district of Gmina Kazimierza Wielka, within Kazimierza County, Świętokrzyskie Voivodeship, in south-central Poland. It lies approximately 7 km (4 mi) south-east of Kazimierza Wielka and 72 km (45 mi) south of the regional capital Kielce.
