= Broniszów, Świętokrzyskie Voivodeship =

Broniszów
- Village
- Location within Poland
- Coordinates: 50°18′5″N 20°30′56″E
- Country: Poland
- Voivodeship: Świętokrzyskie
- County: Kazimierza
- Gmina: Kazimierza Wielka

Broniszów [brɔˈniʂuf] is a village in the administrative district of Gmina Kazimierza Wielka, within Kazimierza County, Świętokrzyskie Voivodeship, in south-central Poland. It lies approximately 4 km (2 mi) north-east of Kazimierza Wielka and 65 km (40 mi) south of the regional capital Kielce.
