= Głuchów =

Głuchów may refer to the following places in Poland:

- In Łódź Voivodeship (central Poland), a province in central Poland
1. Głuchów, Kutno County
2. Głuchów, Łódź East County
3. Głuchów, Skierniewice County
4. Głuchów, Wieluń County
- In Masovian Voivodeship (east-central Poland), largest and most populous Polish province, created in 1999
1. Głuchów, Siedlce County
2. Głuchów, Grójec County
- In Świętokrzyskie Voivodeship (south-central Poland), one of 16 voivodeships (provinces) into which Poland is divided
1. Głuchów, Świętokrzyskie Voivodeship, Kazimierza County
- In Subcarpathian Voivodeship (south-eastern Poland)
- Głuchów, Gostyń County in Greater Poland Voivodeship (west-central Poland)
- Głuchów, Turek County in Greater Poland Voivodeship (central Poland)
- Głuchów, Wschowa County in Lubusz Voivodeship (west Poland)
- Głuchów, Zielona Góra County in Lubusz Voivodeship (west Poland)
1. Głuchów, Subcarpathian Voivodeship, Łańcut County
