= Gmina Kazimierza Wielka =

Gmina Kazimierza Wielka Kazimierza Wielka Commune
- Gmina
- Coat of arms
- Interactive map of Gmina Kazimierza Wielka
- Coordinates (Kazimierza Wielka): 50°16′25″N 20°29′4″E
- Country: Poland
- Voivodeship: Świętokrzyskie
- County: Kazimierza
- Seat: Kazimierza Wielka

Area
  - Total: 140.59 km^{2} (54.28 sq mi)

Population (2006)
  - Total: 16,759
  - Density: 119.20/km^{2} (308.74/sq mi)
  - Urban: 5,730
  - Rural: 11,029
- Website: http://www.kazimierzawielka.pl/

Gmina Kazimierza Wielka is an urban-rural gmina (administrative district) in Kazimierza County, Świętokrzyskie Voivodeship, in south-central Poland. Its seat is the town of Kazimierza Wielka, which lies approximately 69 kilometres (43 mi) south of the regional capital Kielce.

The gmina covers an area of 140.59 square kilometres (54.3 sq mi), and as of 2006 its total population is 16,759 (out of which the population of Kazimierza Wielka amounts to 5,730, and the population of the rural part of the gmina is 11,029).

== Villages ==
Apart from the town of Kazimierza Wielka, Gmina Kazimierza Wielka contains the villages and settlements of Boronice, Broniszów, Chruszczyna Mała, Chruszczyna Wielka, Cło, Cudzynowice, Dalechowice, Donatkowice, Donosy, Gabułtów, Głuchów, Góry Sieradzkie, Gorzków, Gunów-Kolonia, Gunów-Wilków, Hołdowiec, Jakuszowice, Kamieńczyce, Kamyszów, Kazimierza Mała, Krzyszkowice, Łękawa, Lekszyce, Łyczaków, Marcinkowice, Nagórzanki, Odonów, Paśmiechy, Plechów, Plechówka, Podolany, Sieradzice, Skorczów, Słonowice, Stradlice, Wielgus, Wojciechów, Wojsławice, Wymysłów, Zagórzyce, Zięblice and Zysławice.

== Neighbouring gminas ==
Gmina Kazimierza Wielka is bordered by the gminas of Bejsce, Czarnocin, Koszyce, Opatowiec, Pałecznica, Proszowice and Skalbmierz.
