= Civic Light Opera =

Civic Light Opera (CLO) may refer to:

- Los Angeles Civic Light Opera (LACLO)
- Pittsburgh Civic Light Opera (PCLO)
- American Musical Theatre of San Jose, formerly San Jose Civic Light Opera (SJCLO)
- Santa Barbara Civic Light Opera (SBCLO)
- Musical Theatre West, formerly the Whitter Civic Light Opera
