= Federation of Civil Service Organizations =

Trade union

CLO
- Federation of Civil Service Organizations
- Centrale van Landsdienaren Organisaties
- Headquarters: Paramaribo, Suriname
- Location: Suriname
- Affiliations: ITUC

The Federation of Civil Service Organizations (CLO) is a trade union federation of Suriname. It is affiliated with the International Trade Union Confederation.
