= Santa Barbara Civic Light Opera =

- Formation: 1984
- Dissolved: 2001
- Type: Theatre group
- Purpose: Musical theatre

The Santa Barbara Civic Light Opera (SBCLO) was a theatre company in Santa Barbara, California.

SBCLO staged hundreds of performances in the Lobero Theatre, and later the Granada Theater in Santa Barbara before going bankrupt. The company was founded by Paul Iannoccone and Elise Unruh in 1984 and continued to produce shows until filing for bankruptcy in 2001.

SBCLO became the short-lived Musical Theater of Santa Barbara (MTSB) before finally discontinuing productions altogether.
