= Central Legal Office =

The Central Legal Office (CLO) is the organisation that provides NHS Scotland with legal advice and assistance in every area of law relevant to the health service. It is one of the Strategic Business Units of NHS National Services Scotland.

The CLO has teams that cover Litigation, Employment, Commercial Contracts and Commercial Property.

Scottish health boards can pursue debts via the Central Legal Office, usually where patients have had non-emergency treatment but are normally resident outside the European Union.

In 2004 it relocated from Trinity Park House to new office accommodation in Leith.
