= Czarnocin, Świętokrzyskie Voivodeship =

Czarnocin
- Village
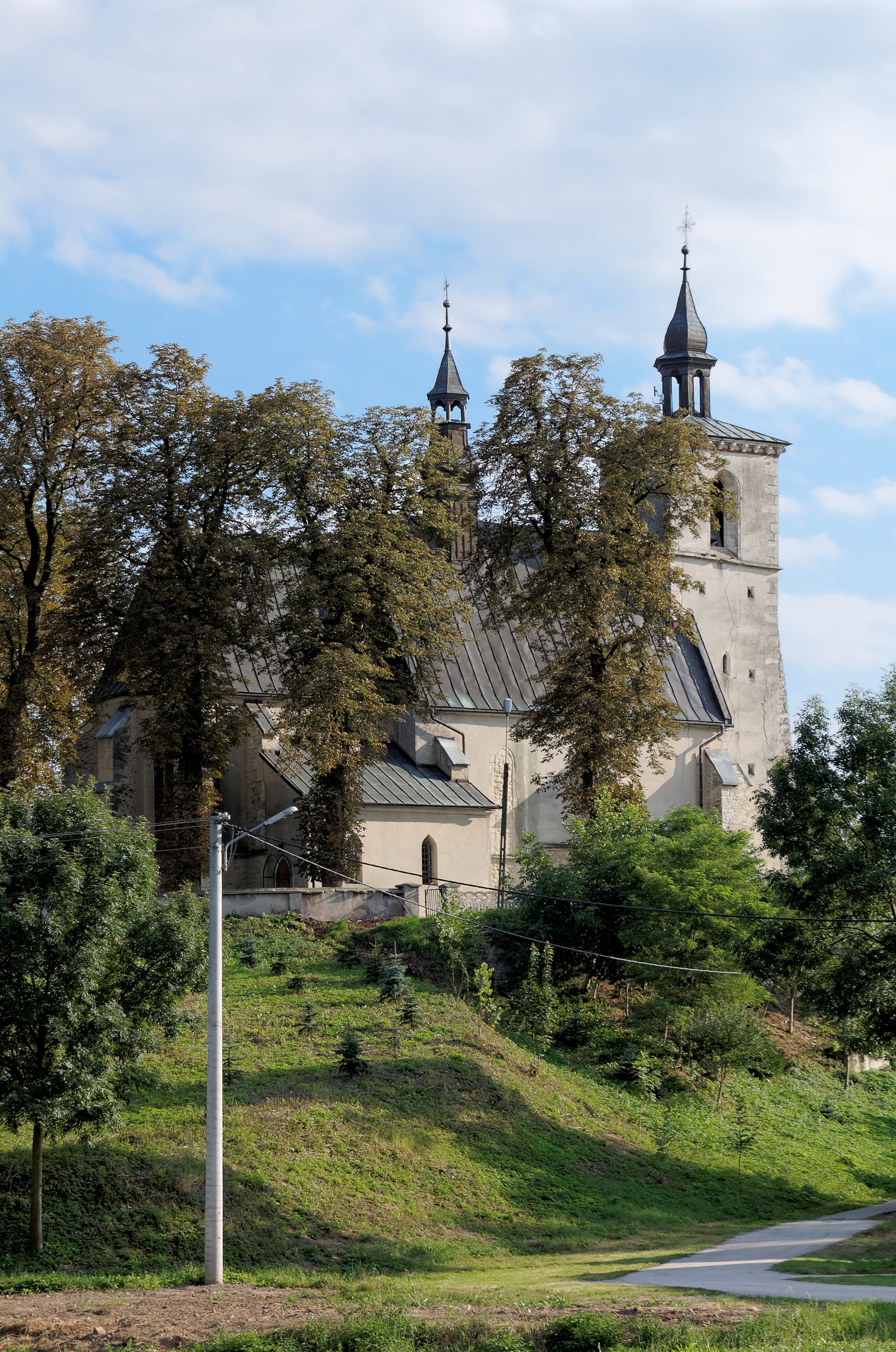
- Catholic church

- Coat of arms

- Location within Poland
- Coordinates: 50°20′40″N 20°31′10″E
- Country: Poland
- Voivodeship: Świętokrzyskie
- County: Kazimierza
- Gmina: Czarnocin

Population (approx.)
  - Total: 470
- Postal code: 28-506

Czarnocin [t͡ʂarˈnɔt͡ɕin] is a village in Kazimierza County, Świętokrzyskie Voivodeship, in south-central Poland. It is the seat of the gmina (administrative district) called Gmina Czarnocin. It lies 9 km (6 mi) north of Kazimierza Wielka and 61 km (38 mi) south of the regional capital Kielce.
