= Kazimierza County =

Kazimierza County Powiat kazimierski
- County
- Flag Coat of arms

- Location within the voivodeship
- Coordinates (Kazimierza Wielka): 50°16′25″N 20°29′4″E
- Country: Poland
- Voivodeship: Świętokrzyskie
- Seat: Kazimierza Wielka
- Gminas: Total 5: Gmina Bejsce; Gmina Czarnocin; Gmina Kazimierza Wielka; Gmina Opatowiec; Gmina Skalbmierz

Area
  - Total: 422.48 km^{2} (163.12 sq mi)

Population (2019)
  - Total: 33,408
  - Density: 79.076/km^{2} (204.81/sq mi)
  - Urban: 6,835
  - Rural: 26,573
- Car plates: TKA
- Website: www.kazimierzaw.pl

Kazimierza County (Polish: powiat kazimierski) is a unit of territorial administration and local government (powiat) in Świętokrzyskie Voivodeship, south-central Poland. It came into being on January 1, 1999, as a result of the Polish local government reforms passed in 1998. Its administrative seat and largest town is Kazimierza Wielka, which lies 69 kilometres (43 mi) south of the regional capital Kielce. The two other towns in the county are Skalbmierz, lying 9 km (6 mi) north-west of Kazimierza Wielka, and Opatowiec, the smallest town in Poland, lying 18 km (11 mi) east of Kazimierza Wielka.

The county covers an area of 422.48 square kilometres (163.1 sq mi). As of 2019 its total population is 33,408, out of which the population of Kazimierza Wielka is 5,550, that of Skalbmierz is 1,285, and the rural population is 26,573.

== Neighbouring counties ==
Kazimierza County is bordered by Pińczów County to the north, Busko County to the north-east, Dąbrowa County to the east, Tarnów County to the south-east, and Proszowice County and Miechów County to the west.

== Administrative divisions ==
The county is subdivided into five gminas (three urban-rural and two rural). These are listed in the following table, in descending order of population.

Gmina	Type	Area (km^{2})	Population (2019)	Seat
Gmina Kazimierza Wielka	urban-rural	140.6	16,177	Kazimierza Wielka
Gmina Skalbmierz	urban-rural	86.2	6,468	Skalbmierz
Gmina Bejsce	rural	57.7	4,021	Bejsce
Gmina Czarnocin	rural	69.5	3,792	Czarnocin
Gmina Opatowiec	urban-rural	68.4	2,950	Opatowiec
