= Kazimierza Wielka =

Town in Świętokrzyskie Voivodeship, Poland

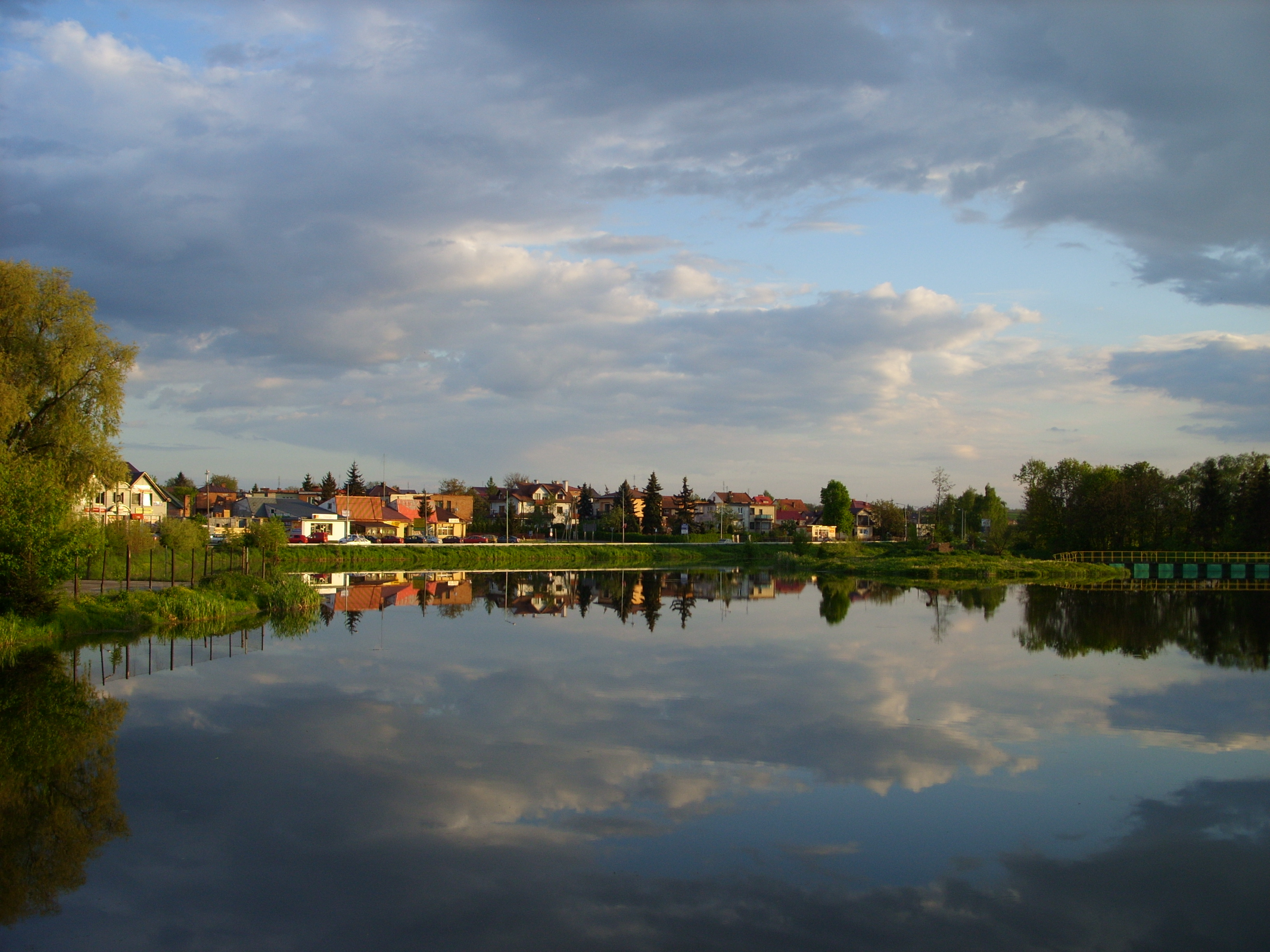
- Lake in Kazimierza Wielka

- Coat of arms

- Location within Poland
- Coordinates: 50°16′25″N 20°29′4″E
- Country: Poland
- Voivodeship: Świętokrzyskie
- County: Kazimierza
- Gmina: Kazimierza Wielka

Government
  - Mayor: Adam Andrzej Bodzioch (PO)

Area
  - Total: 5.34 km^{2} (2.06 sq mi)

Population (2012)
  - Total: 5,575
  - Density: 1,040/km^{2} (2,700/sq mi)
- Postal code: 28-500
- Area code: +48 41
- Vehicle registration: TKA
- Website: http://www.kazimierzawielka.pl/

Kazimierza Wielka ([kaʑiˈmʲɛʐa ˈvʲɛlka]) is a town in southern Poland, in Świętokrzyskie Voivodeship. It lies approximately 45 kilometres (28 miles) northeast of Kraków. It is the administrative seat of Kazimierza County. With a population of 5,848 (2005), it is the smallest county seat in Poland. Kazimierza Wielka is located in Lesser Poland Upland and historically belongs to the province of Lesser Poland. For most of its history, it was a village, and did not receive its town charter until 1959.

== History ==
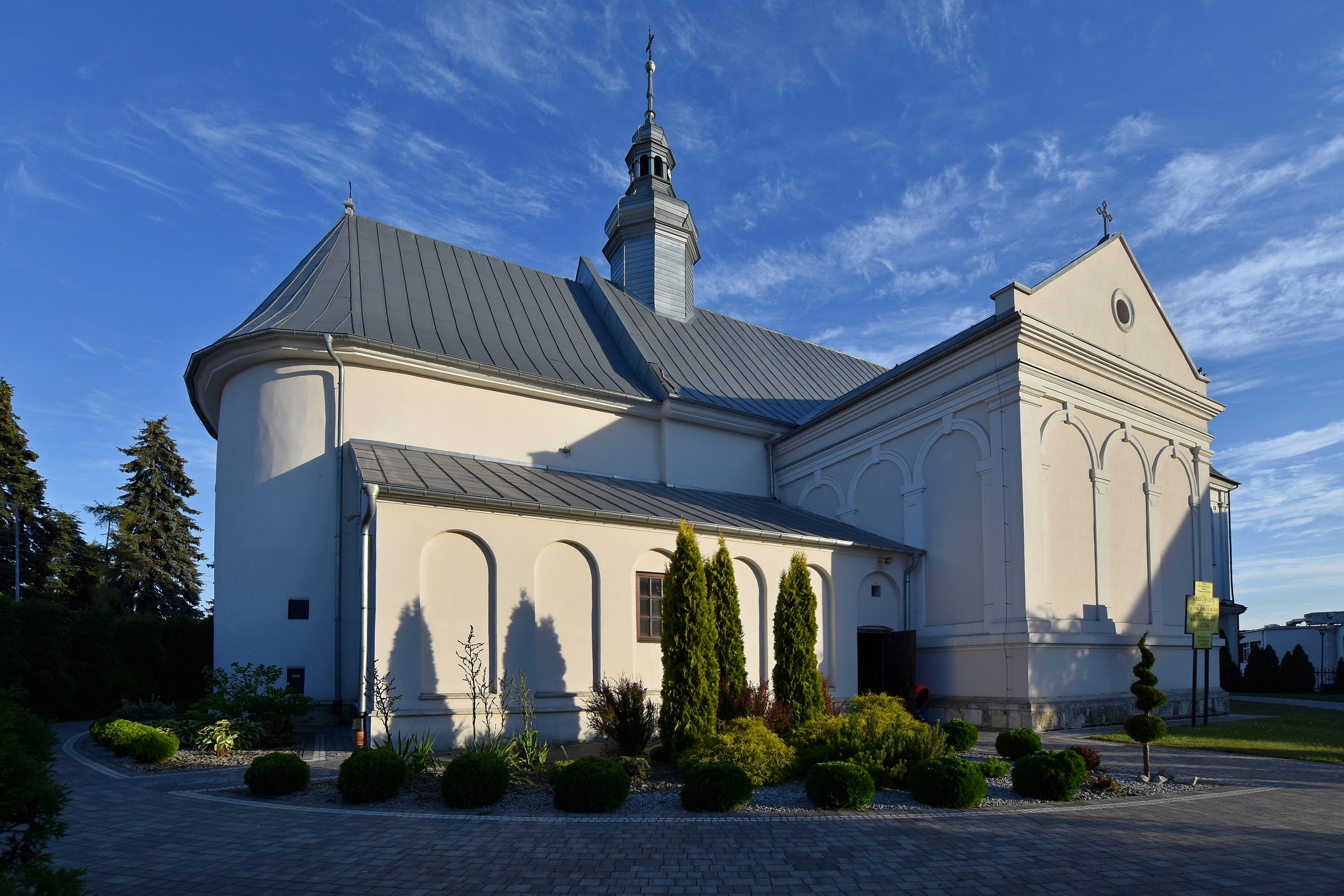
Exaltation of the Holy Cross church from 1633

The first mention of the village dates from 1320 during the reign of Władysław I Łokietek. At that time, its name was spelled Cazimiria and it belonged to the Kazimierski family. In the Kingdom of Poland, Kazimierza Wielka was located in the Proszowice County in the Krakow Voivodeship in the Lesser Poland Province, while neighboring Kazimierza Mała belonged to Wiślica County of Sandomierz Voivodeship. In the 1560s, Kazimierza Wielka was one of centers of the Polish Brethren. At the end of the 18th century, the estate was the property of the magnate Łubieński family. They established there one of the first sugar refineries in Poland in 1845.

After the Partitions of Poland the village belonged to Austria. After the Polish victory in the Austro-Polish War of 1809, it became part of the short-lived Duchy of Warsaw. Following the duchy's dissolution, it became part of Russian-controlled Congress Poland. In 1918, Poland regained independence and control of Kazimierza Wielka, which was afterwards administratively located in the Kielce Voivodeship. According to the 1921 census, Kazimierza Wielka with the adjacent manor farm had a population of 2,283, 88.6% Polish and 11.3% Jewish.

During the German invasion of Poland at the start of World War II, on September 5, 1939, a skirmish between the advancing Wehrmacht and Polish 55th Infantry Division took place in the village in which 60 Polish soldiers died. Afterwards it was occupied by Germany. The Polish resistance movement was active in the town and area, including a local unit of the Home Army under the cryptonym "Kasztan" ("Chestnut"). On 27 July 1944, the town was liberated by Home Army partisans, and then became the capital of the short-lived Polish "Kazimierza-Proszowice Partisan Republic". The partisans seized a large amount of weapons and ammunition from the Germans and their Ukrainian auxiliaries.

In 1956 Kazimierza Wielka County was created, and three years later, the village received its town rights. Its most important historic building is a local parish church (1633).

== Transport ==
Kazimierza Wielka is bypassed by voivodeship roads 768 and 776 which form a ring around the town.

The nearest railway station is in Słomniki.

== Education ==
- Public High School in Kazimierza Wielka
- Hugon Kollataj Primary School No. 1
- John Paul II Primary School No. 3

== People associated with the town ==
- Rula Lenska, British-born actress of Polish noble ancestry
- Henryk Łubieński, financier and industrialist
- Ludwik Maria Łubieński, diplomat and officer in WWII
- Andrew Peter Wypych, former Auxiliary Bishop of Chicago

== International relations ==
- Buchach, Ukraine
