= September 14 =

September 14 this year in various calendars
- Monday, 14 September 2026
Akan	Fodwo
Armenian	26 Hoṙi 1476
Aztec	Tititl 7, 1 Cuāuhtli
Babylonian	1 Ululu, 2337 SE
Balinese pawukon	Menga, Pasah, Sri, Wage, Tungleh, Coma of Parangbakat, Sri, Urungan, Dewa
Bengali	30 Bhadro, BS 1433
Chinese	Yin Metal Rabbit・Exntended Net Mansion; Fire Horse Year, Month 8, Day 4 (Bailu, 9 days until Qiufen)
Common Era	14 September 2026 CE
Coptic	4 Thout, AM 1743
Egyptian	1 Mechir, 2775 NE
Ethiopian	4 Maskaram, 2019 Amätä Məhrät
French Republican	Décade III, Octidi de Fructidor de l'Année 234 de la République
Gregorian	14 September, AD 2026
Hebrew	3 Tishrei, AM 5787
Hindu	Citrā・Brahman; Solar: 29 Bhādrapada, 1948 SE; Lunisolar: Tr̥tīyā, Śukla pakṣa of Bhādrapada, 2083 VE; Rāudra・5127 KY・1,872,832
Icelandic	Mánudagur, 21 Tvímánuður 2026
Islamic	1 Rabi' al-thani, AH 1448 (using tabular method)
ISO week date	2026-W38-1
Japanese	4 Hazuki, Reiwa 8 (Hakuro, 9 days until Shūbun)
Julian	1 September, AD 2026 (AM 7534)
Julian day	2461298
Korean	4 Dakdal, 4359 DE
Maya	13.0.13.16.15; 8 Chen, 1 Men
Roman	Kalendis Septembribus, MMDCCLXXIX AUC
Solar Hijri	23 Shahrivar, SH 1405
Tibetan	3 khrums, me pho rta 2153 or 1772 or 1000

<<	September					>>
Su	Mo	Tu	We	Th	Fr	Sa
		1	2	3	4	5
6	7	8	9	10	11	12
13	14	15	16	17	18	19
20	21	22	23	24	25	26
27	28	29	30
2026

September 14 in recent years
2026 (Monday)
2025 (Sunday)
2024 (Saturday)
2023 (Thursday)
2022 (Wednesday)
2021 (Tuesday)
2020 (Monday)
2019 (Saturday)
2018 (Friday)
2017 (Thursday)

September 14 is the 257th day of the year (258th in leap years) in the Gregorian calendar; 108 days remain until the end of the year.

== Events ==
=== Pre-1600 ===
- AD 81 – Domitian became Emperor of the Roman Empire upon the death of his brother Titus.
- 775 – Leo IV the Khazar becomes Byzantine Emperor following the death of his father Constantine V.
- 786 – "Night of the three Caliphs": Harun al-Rashid becomes the Abbasid caliph upon the death of his brother al-Hadi. Birth of Harun's son al-Ma'mun.
- 919 – Battle of Islandbridge: High King Niall Glúndub is killed while leading an Irish coalition against the Vikings of Uí Ímair, led by King Sitric Cáech.
- 987 – Bardas Phokas the Younger rebels against Byzantine emperor Basil II and declares himself emperor.
- 1115 – Roger of Salerno's Crusader army defeats a numerically superior Seljuk army in the battle of Sarmin
- 1141 – An army of queen Matilda defeats and disperses an army of empress Matilda which was besieging Winchester. Robert of Gloucester is captured and exchanged for king Stephen, husband of queen Matilda.
- 1146 – Seljuk atabeg Imad al-Din Zengi of Mosul is assassinated by a slave and succeeded by his quarrelling sons.
- 1180 – Genpei War: In the Battle of Ishibashiyama in Japan, the new military commander of the Minamoto clan, Minamoto no Yoritomo, is routed by Ōba Kagechika of the Taira clan.
- 1210 – Maria of Montferrat, Queen of Jerusalem, marries French baron John of Brienne, who is later crowned king on 30 October in Tyre.
- 1226 – The first recorded instance of the Catholic practice of perpetual Eucharistic adoration formally begins in Avignon, France.
- 1402 – Battle of Homildon Hill: An invading Scottish army under Murdoch Stewart, Duke of Albany and Archibald, Earl Douglas is decimated by a contingent of 500 English archers under the command of George, Earl of March and Henry Percy, 1st Earl of Northumberland.

=== 1601–1900 ===
- 1682 – Bishop Gore School, one of the oldest schools in Wales, is founded.
- 1685 – Morean War: the Battle of Kalamata ends in a Venetian victory over the forces of the Ottoman Empire under the Kapudan Pasha.
- 1723 – Grand Master António Manoel de Vilhena lays down the first stone of Fort Manoel in Malta.
- 1741 – George Frideric Handel completes his oratorio Messiah.
- 1752 – The British Empire adopts the Gregorian calendar, skipping eleven days (the previous day was September 2).
- 1763 – Seneca warriors defeat British forces at the Battle of Devil's Hole during Pontiac's War.
- 1782 – American Revolutionary War: Review of the French troops under General Rochambeau by General George Washington at Verplanck's Point, New York.
- 1791 – The Papal States lose Avignon to Revolutionary France.
- 1808 – Finnish War: Russians defeat the Swedes at the Battle of Oravais.
- 1812 – Napoleonic Wars: The French Grande Armée enters Moscow. The Fire of Moscow begins as soon as Russian troops leave the city.
- 1814 – Battle of Baltimore: The poem Defence of Fort McHenry is written by Francis Scott Key. The poem is later used as the lyrics of The Star-Spangled Banner.
- 1829 – The Ottoman Empire signs the Treaty of Adrianople with Russia, thus ending the Russo-Turkish War.
- 1846 – Jang Bahadur and his brothers massacre about 40 members of the Nepalese palace court.
- 1862 – American Civil War: The Battle of South Mountain, part of the Maryland Campaign, is fought.

=== 1901–present ===
- 1901 – U.S. president William McKinley dies after being mortally wounded on September 6 by anarchist Leon Czolgosz and is succeeded by Vice President Theodore Roosevelt.
- 1911 – Russian Premier Pyotr Stolypin is shot by Dmitry Bogrov while attending a performance of Rimsky-Korsakov's The Tale of Tsar Saltan at the Kiev Opera House, in the presence of Tsar Nicholas II.
- 1914 – HMAS AE1, the Royal Australian Navy's first submarine, is lost at sea with all hands near East New Britain, Papua New Guinea.
- 1917 – The Russian Empire is formally replaced by the Russian Republic.
- 1936 – Raoul Villain, who assassinated the French Socialist Jean Jaurès, is himself killed by Spanish Republicans in Ibiza.
- 1939 – World War II: The Estonian military boards the Polish submarine ORP Orzeł in Tallinn, sparking a diplomatic incident that the Soviet Union will later use to justify the annexation of Estonia.
- 1940 – Ip massacre: The Hungarian Army, supported by local Hungarians, kill 158 Romanian civilians in Ip, Sălaj, a village in Northern Transylvania, an act of ethnic cleansing.
- 1943 – World War II: The Wehrmacht starts a three-day retaliatory operation targeting several Greek villages in the region of Viannos, whose death toll would eventually exceed 500 persons.
- 1944 – World War II: Maastricht becomes the first Dutch city to be liberated by allied forces.
- 1948 – The Indian Army captures the city of Aurangabad as part of Operation Polo.
- 1954 – In a top secret nuclear test, a Soviet Tu-4 bomber drops a 40 kiloton atomic weapon just north of Totskoye village.
- 1958 – The first two German post-war rockets, designed by the German engineer Ernst Mohr, reach the upper atmosphere.
- 1960 – The Organization of Petroleum Exporting Countries (OPEC) is founded.
- 1960 – Congo Crisis: Mobutu Sese Seko seizes power in a military coup, suspending parliament and the constitution.
- 1975 – The first American saint, Elizabeth Ann Seton, is canonized by Pope Paul VI.
- 1979 – Afghan leader Nur Muhammad Taraki is assassinated upon the order of Hafizullah Amin, who becomes the new General Secretary of the People's Democratic Party.
- 1982 – President-elect of Lebanon Bachir Gemayel is assassinated.
- 1984 – Joe Kittinger becomes the first person to fly a gas balloon alone across the Atlantic Ocean.
- 1985 – Penang Bridge, the longest bridge in Malaysia, connecting the island of Penang to the mainland, opens to traffic.
- 1989 – The Standard Gravure shooting where Joseph T. Wesbecker, a 47-year-old pressman, killed eight people and injured 12 people at his former workplace, Standard Gravure, before committing suicide.
- 1992 – The Constitutional Court of Bosnia and Herzegovina declares the breakaway Croatian Republic of Herzeg-Bosnia to be illegal.
- 1993 – Lufthansa Flight 2904, an Airbus A320, crashes into an embankment after overshooting the runway at Okęcie International Airport (now Warsaw Chopin Airport), killing two people.
- 1994 – The rest of the Major League Baseball season is canceled because of a strike.
- 1997 – Eighty-one killed as five bogies of the Ahmedabad–Howrah Express plunge into a river in Bilaspur district of Madhya Pradesh, India.
- 1998 – Telecommunications companies MCI Communications and WorldCom complete their $37 billion merger to form MCI WorldCom.
- 1999 – Kiribati, Nauru and Tonga join the United Nations.
- 2000 – Microsoft releases Windows Me.
- 2001 – Historic National Prayer Service held at Washington National Cathedral for victims of the September 11 attacks. A similar service is held in Canada on Parliament Hill, the largest vigil ever held in the nation's capital.
- 2002 – Total Linhas Aéreas Flight 5561 crashes near Paranapanema, Brazil, killing both pilots on board.
- 2003 – In a referendum, Estonia approves joining the European Union.
- 2003 – Bissau-Guinean President Kumba Ialá is ousted from power in a bloodless military coup led by General Veríssimo Correia Seabra.
- 2007 – Prelude to the 2008 financial crisis: Northern Rock bank experiences the first bank run in the United Kingdom in 150 years.
- 2008 – Aeroflot Flight 821, a Boeing 737-500, crashes into a section of the Trans-Siberian Railway while on approach to Perm International Airport, in Perm, Russia, killing all 88 people on board.
- 2015 – The first observation of gravitational waves is made, announced by the LIGO and Virgo collaborations on 11 February 2016.
- 2019 – Yemen's Houthi rebels claim responsibility for an attack on Saudi Arabian oil facilities.
- 2022 – Death of Queen Elizabeth II: The Queen's coffin is taken from Buckingham Palace, placed on a gun carriage of The King's Troop Royal Horse Artillery and moved in a procession to Westminster Hall for her lying in state over the next four days with the queue of mourners stretching for miles along the River Thames.

== Births ==
=== Pre-1600 ===
- 208 – Diadumenian, Roman emperor (died 218)
- 768 – Al-Ma'mun, Abbasid caliph, 7th (died 833)
- 938 – Sahib ibn Abbad, Persian scholar and statesman (died 995)
- 953 – Guo Zongxun, Chinese emperor (died 973)
- 1032 – Dao Zong, Chinese emperor (died 1101)
- 1246 – John Fitzalan III, English nobleman (died 1272)
- 1384 – Ephraim of Nea Makri, Greek martyr and saint (died 1426)
- 1388 – Claudius Clavus, Danish geographer and cartographer (died 1438)
- 1401 – Maria of Castile, Queen consort of Aragon and Naples (died 1458)
- 1485 – Anna of Mecklenburg-Schwerin, Landgravine of Hesse (died 1525)
- 1486 – Heinrich Cornelius Agrippa, German theologian, astrologer, and alchemist (died 1535)
- 1543 – Claudio Acquaviva, Italian priest, 5th Superior General of the Society of Jesus (died 1615)
- 1547 – Johan van Oldenbarnevelt, Dutch politician (died 1619)
- 1580 – Francisco de Quevedo, Spanish poet and politician (died 1645)

=== 1601–1900 ===
- 1618 – Peter Lely, Dutch-English painter (died 1680)
- 1643 – Jeremiah Dummer, American silversmith (died 1718)
- 1656 – Thomas Baker, English historian and author (died 1746)
- 1713 – Johann Kies, German astronomer and mathematician (died 1781)
- 1721 – Eliphalet Dyer, American colonel, lawyer, and politician (died 1807)
- 1736 – Robert Raikes, English philanthropist, founded Sunday school (died 1811)
- 1737 – Michael Haydn, Austrian singer and composer (died 1806)
- 1769 – Alexander von Humboldt, German geographer and explorer (died 1859)
- 1774 – Lord William Bentinck, English general and politician, 14th Governor-General of India (died 1839)
- 1791 – Franz Bopp, German linguist and academic (died 1867)
- 1804 – John Gould, English ornithologist and illustrator (died 1881)
- 1804 – Louis Désiré Maigret, French bishop (died 1882)
- 1816 – Mary Hall Barrett Adams, American book editor and letter writer (died 1860)
- 1837 – Nikolai Bugaev, Georgian-Russian mathematician and philosopher (died 1903)
- 1843 – Lola Rodríguez de Tió, Puerto Rican poet, abolitionist, and women's rights activist (died 1924)
- 1847 – Fanny Holland, English actress and singer (died 1931)
- 1850 – Anton Mahnič, Slovenian bishop, philosopher, and theologian (died 1920)
- 1853 – Ponnambalam Arunachalam, Ceylonese civil servant and politician (died 1924)
- 1857 – Julia Platt, American embryologist and politician (died 1935)
- 1860 – Hamlin Garland, American novelist, poet, essayist, and short story writer (died 1940)
- 1864 – Robert Cecil, 1st Viscount Cecil of Chelwood, English lawyer and politician, Under-Secretary of State for Foreign Affairs, Nobel Prize laureate (died 1958)
- 1867 – Charles Dana Gibson, American illustrator (died 1944)
- 1868 – Théodore Botrel, French singer-songwriter, poet, and playwright (died 1925)
- 1869 – Kid Nichols, American baseball player and manager (died 1953)
- 1872 – John Olof Dahlgren, Swedish-American soldier, Medal of Honor recipient (died 1963)
- 1879 – Margaret Sanger, American nurse and activist (died 1966)
- 1880 – Benjamin, Russian bishop and missionary (died 1961)
- 1880 – Archie Hahn, American sprinter, football player, and coach (died 1955)
- 1883 – Richard Gerstl, Austrian painter and illustrator (died 1908)
- 1885 – Vittorio Gui, Italian conductor, composer, and critic (died 1975)
- 1886 – Jan Masaryk, Czech soldier and politician, Czech Minister of Foreign Affairs (died 1948)
- 1887 – Karl Taylor Compton, American physicist (died 1954)
- 1891 – Ivan Matveyevich Vinogradov, Russian mathematician and academic (died 1983)
- 1892 – Laurence W. Allen, English lieutenant and pilot (died 1968)
- 1896 – José Mojica, Mexican tenor and actor (died 1974)
- 1898 – Lawrence Gellert, Hungarian-American musicologist and song collector (died 1979)
- 1898 – Ernest Nash, German-Italian photographer and scholar (died 1974)

=== 1901–present ===
- 1902 – Giorgos Papasideris, Greek singer-songwriter (died 1977)
- 1902 – Alice Tully, American soprano and philanthropist (died 1993)
- 1903 – Mart Raud, Estonian poet and author (died 1980)
- 1904 – Frank Amyot, Canadian sprint canoeist (died 1962)
- 1904 – Richard Mohaupt, German composer and Kapellmeister (died 1957)
- 1907 – Yuri Ivask, Russian-American poet and critic (died 1986)
- 1909 – Peter Scott, English ornithologist, painter, and sailor (died 1989)
- 1910 – Lehman Engel, American composer and conductor (died 1982)
- 1910 – Jack Hawkins, English actor and producer (died 1973)
- 1910 – Yiannis Latsis, Greek businessman (died 2003)
- 1910 – Rolf Liebermann, Swiss-French composer and manager (died 1999)
- 1910 – Rasuna Said, Indonesian women's rights campaigner and national hero (died 1965)
- 1911 – William H. Armstrong, American author and educator (died 1999)
- 1913 – Jacobo Árbenz, Guatemalan captain and politician, President of Guatemala (died 1971)
- 1913 – Rubby Sherr, American physicist and academic (died 2013)
- 1914 – Mae Boren Axton, American composer and educator (died 1997)
- 1915 – John Dobson, Chinese-American astronomer and author, designed the Dobsonian telescope (died 2014)
- 1916 – Eric Bentley, English-American singer, playwright, and critic (died 2020)
- 1916 – John Heyer, Australian director and producer (died 2001)
- 1917 – Rudolf Baumgartner, Swiss violinist and conductor (died 2002)
- 1918 – Georges Berger, Belgian race car driver (died 1967)
- 1918 – Cachao López, Cuban-American bassist and composer (died 2008)
- 1919 – Deryck Cooke, English musicologist and broadcaster (died 1976)
- 1919 – Gil Langley, Australian cricketer, footballer, and politician (died 2001)
- 1919 – Olga Lowe, South African-English actress (died 2013)
- 1919 – Kay Medford, American actress (died 1980)
- 1920 – Mario Benedetti, Uruguayan journalist and author (died 2009)
- 1920 – Lawrence Klein, American economist and academic, Nobel Prize laureate (died 2013)
- 1920 – Alberto Calderón, Argentinian-American mathematician and academic (died 1998)
- 1921 – Constance Baker Motley, American lawyer, judge, and politician (died 2005)
- 1921 – A. Jean de Grandpré, Canadian lawyer, businessman, and academic (died 2022)
- 1921 – Paul Poberezny, American pilot and businessman, founded the Experimental Aircraft Association (died 2013)
- 1921 – Dario Vittori, Italian-Argentinian actor and producer (died 2001)
- 1922 – Michel Auclair, German-French actor (died 1988)
- 1922 – Frances Bergen, American model and actress (died 2006)
- 1922 – Alfred Käärmann, Estonian soldier and author (died 2010)
- 1923 – Nicholas Georgiadis, Greek painter and costume designer (died 2001)
- 1924 – Patricia Barringer, American baseball player and accountant (died 2007)
- 1924 – Jerry Coleman, American baseball player and manager (died 2014)
- 1924 – Abioseh Nicol, Sierra Leonean-English physician, academic, and diplomat (died 1994)
- 1924 – Wim Polak, Dutch journalist and politician, Mayor of Amsterdam (died 1999)
- 1926 – Michel Butor, French author and critic (died 2016)
- 1926 – Richard Ellsasser, American organist, composer, and conductor (died 1972)
- 1926 – Carmen Franco, 1st Duchess of Franco, Spanish noblewoman (died 2017)
- 1927 – Martin Caidin, American author and screenwriter (died 1997)
- 1927 – Janet Davies, English actress (died 1986)
- 1927 – Gardner Dickinson, American golfer (died 1998)
- 1927 – Jim Fanning, American-Canadian baseball player and manager (died 2015)
- 1927 – Edmund Szoka, American cardinal (died 2014)
- 1928 – Jay Cameron, American reed player and saxophonist (died 2001)
- 1928 – Alberto Korda, Cuban photographer (died 2001)
- 1928 – Angus Ogilvy, English businessman (died 2004)
- 1929 – Larry Collins, American-French journalist, historian, and author (died 2005)
- 1930 – Allan Bloom, American philosopher and academic (died 1992)
- 1930 – Romola Costantino, Australian pianist and critic (died 1988)
- 1930 – Eugene I. Gordon, American physicist and engineer (died 2014)
- 1932 – Harry Sinden, Canadian ice hockey player, coach, and manager
- 1932 – John Tembo, Malawian politician (died 2023)
- 1933 – Zoe Caldwell, Australian actress (died 2020)
- 1933 – Harve Presnell, American actor and singer (died 2009)
- 1934 – Sarah Kofman, French philosopher and academic (died 1994)
- 1934 – Paul Little, New Zealand rugby player (died 1993)
- 1934 – Don Walser, American singer-songwriter and guitarist (died 2006)
- 1935 – Fujio Akatsuka, Japanese illustrator (died 2008)
- 1936 – Harry Danielsen, Norwegian educator and politician (died 2011)
- 1936 – Terence Donovan, English photographer and director (died 1996)
- 1936 – Ferid Murad, American physician and pharmacologist, Nobel Prize laureate (died 2023)
- 1936 – Lucas Samaras, Greek-American painter and photographer (died 2024)
- 1937 – Renzo Piano, Italian architect and engineer, designed The Shard and The New York Times Building
- 1938 – Franco Califano, Libya-born Italian singer-songwriter (died 2013)
- 1938 – Nicol Williamson, Scottish actor (died 2011)
- 1939 – DeWitt Weaver, American golfer (died 2021)
- 1940 – Ventseslav Konstantinov, Bulgarian writer and translator (died 2019)
- 1940 – Padmakar Shivalkar, Indian cricketer (died 2025)
- 1941 – Bruce Hyde, American actor and academic (died 2015)
- 1941 – Ian Kennedy, English lawyer and academic
- 1941 – Joan Trumpauer Mulholland, American civil rights activist
- 1941 – Alberto Naranjo, Venezuelan drummer, composer, and bandleader (died 2020)
- 1941 – Alex St. Clair, American guitarist and songwriter (died 2006)
- 1942 – Oliver Lake, American saxophonist, flute player, and composer
- 1942 – Roger Lyons, English trade union leader
- 1942 – Bernard MacLaverty, Irish author, playwright, and screenwriter
- 1943 – Irwin Goodman, Finnish singer-composer and guitarist (died 1991)
- 1943 – Marcos Valle, Brazilian singer-songwriter, pianist, and producer
- 1944 – Rowena Morrill, American artist (died 2021)
- 1944 – Günter Netzer, German footballer and manager
- 1945 – Martin Tyler, English sportscaster
- 1946 – Pete Agnew, Scottish rock bassist and singer
- 1946 – Jim Angle, American soldier and journalist (died 2022)
- 1946 – Wolfgang Sühnholz, German-American soccer player and coach (died 2019)
- 1946 – Kjell Gjerseth, Norwegian novelist and journalist (died 2025)
- 1947 – Sam Neill, New Zealand actor (died 2026)
- 1948 – Marc Reisner, American environmentalist and author (died 2000)
- 1949 – Steve Gaines, American singer-songwriter and guitarist (died 1977)
- 1949 – Ed King, American guitarist and songwriter (died 2018)
- 1949 – Tommy Seebach, Danish singer-songwriter, pianist, and producer (died 2003)
- 1949 – Fred "Sonic" Smith, American guitarist and songwriter (died 1994)
- 1949 – Eikichi Yazawa, Japanese singer-songwriter
- 1950 – Paul Kossoff, English guitarist and songwriter (died 1976)
- 1950 – Masami Kuwashima, Japanese race car driver
- 1950 – Mike Nifong, American lawyer and politician
- 1950 – John Steptoe, American author and illustrator (died 1989)
- 1951 – Volodymyr Melnykov, Ukrainian poet, writer, songwriter and composer
- 1951 – Joe McDonnell, Provisional Irish Republican Army, died on hunger strike (died 1981)
- 1953 – Tom Cora, American cellist and composer (died 1998)
- 1953 – Judy Playfair, Australian swimmer
- 1954 – Barry Cowsill, American singer-songwriter, keyboard player, and producer (died 2005)
- 1954 – David Wojnarowicz, American painter and photographer (died 1992)
- 1955 – Geraldine Brooks, Australian-American novelist and journalist
- 1955 – William Jackson, Scottish harp player and composer
- 1955 – Edu Manzano, American-Filipino actor and politician
- 1955 – Pope Leo XIV
- 1956 – Paul Allott, English cricketer and sportscaster
- 1956 – Kostas Karamanlis, Greek lawyer and politician, 181st Prime Minister of Greece
- 1956 – Nathalie Roussel, French actress
- 1956 – Ray Wilkins, English footballer and manager (died 2018)
- 1956 – Lefteris Zagoritis, Greek lawyer and politician
- 1957 – Tim Wallach, American baseball player and coach
- 1957 – Kepler Wessels, South African cricketer, coach, and sportscaster
- 1958 – Paul Clark, English footballer and manager
- 1958 – Jeff Crowe, New Zealand cricketer, referee, and manager
- 1958 – Arlindo Cruz, Brazilian singer-songwriter
- 1958 – Billy Abercromby, Scottish footballer (died 2024)
- 1960 – Ronald Lengkeek, Dutch footballer
- 1960 – Callum Keith Rennie, English-Canadian actor and producer
- 1961 – Freeman Mbowe, Tanzanian politician
- 1961 – Wendy Thomas, American businesswoman
- 1962 – Robert Herjavec, Croatian-Canadian businessman
- 1962 – Tom Kurvers, American ice hockey player and sportscaster (died 2021)
- 1962 – Nick Botterill, British business man
- 1962 – Bonnie Jo Campbell, American novelist and short story writer
- 1963 – Robin Singh, Trinidadian-Indian cricketer and coach
- 1965 – Emily Bell, English journalist and academic
- 1965 – Kevin O'Hare, English ballet dancer and director
- 1966 – Iztok Puc, Croatian-Slovenian handball player (died 2011)
- 1966 – Aamer Sohail, Pakistani cricketer and politician
- 1967 – Jens Lien, Norwegian director, producer, and screenwriter
- 1967 – John Power, English singer-songwriter and guitarist
- 1968 – Grant Shapps, English politician
- 1969 – Denis Betts, English rugby league player and coach
- 1969 – Konstandinos Koukodimos, Australian-Greek long jumper and politician
- 1970 – Francesco Casagrande, Italian cyclist
- 1970 – Satoshi Kojima, Japanese wrestler
- 1970 – Jason Martin, Australian rugby league player, singer, and guitarist
- 1970 – Craig Montoya, American singer-songwriter and bass player
- 1970 – Mark Webber, English guitarist
- 1971 – Jeff Loomis, American guitarist and songwriter
- 1971 – Andre Matos, Brazilian singer-songwriter and pianist (died 2019)
- 1971 – Christopher McCulloch, American voice actor, producer, and screenwriter
- 1972 – Notah Begay III, American golfer
- 1972 – David Bell, American baseball player and coach
- 1973 – Tony Bui, Vietnamese director, producer, and screenwriter
- 1973 – Terrell Fletcher, American football player
- 1973 – Linvoy Primus, English footballer
- 1973 – Mike Ward, Canadian comedian and actor
- 1974 – Chad Bradford, American baseball player
- 1974 – Hicham El Guerrouj, Moroccan runner
- 1974 – Mattias Marklund, Swedish guitarist
- 1974 – Sunday Oliseh, Nigerian footballer and manager
- 1974 – Helgi Sigurðsson, Icelandic footballer
- 1974 – Patrick van Balkom, Dutch sprinter
- 1976 – Agustín Calleri, Argentinian tennis player
- 1976 – Kevin Lyttle, Vincentian soca artist
- 1977 – Mattias Agabus, Estonian architect
- 1977 – Malik Bendjelloul, Swedish director and producer (died 2014)
- 1977 – Miyu Matsuki, Japanese voice actress and singer (died 2015)
- 1978 – Ben Cohen, English rugby union player
- 1978 – Ron DeSantis, American politician, 46th Governor of Florida
- 1978 – Carmen Kass, Estonian model and actress
- 1978 – Danielle Peck, American singer-songwriter
- 1979 – Ivica Olić, Croatian footballer
- 1979 – Stefan Stam, Dutch footballer
- 1980 – Ayọ, German singer-songwriter and actress
- 1980 – Gareth Maybin, Northern Irish professional golfer
- 1981 – Miyavi, Japanese singer-songwriter, guitarist, and producer
- 1981 – Stefan Reisinger, German footballer
- 1981 – Yumi Adachi, Japanese actress and singer
- 1982 – SoShy, French-American singer-songwriter
- 1982 – Petr Průcha, Czech ice hockey player
- 1983 – Arash Borhani, Iranian footballer
- 1983 – Josh Outman, American baseball player
- 1983 – Frostee Rucker, American football player
- 1983 – Amy Winehouse, British singer-songwriter, musician, and businesswoman (died 2011)
- 1984 – Ayushmann Khurrana, Indian actor, singer and anchor
- 1985 – Alex Clare, English singer and songwriter
- 1985 – Paolo Gregoletto, American bass player and songwriter
- 1985 – Trevis Smith, American football player
- 1985 – Aya Ueto, Japanese actress and singer
- 1985 – Delmon Young, American baseball player
- 1986 – David Desharnais, Canadian ice hockey player
- 1986 – Jonathan Monaghan, American director, producer, and screenwriter
- 1986 – Steven Naismith, Scottish footballer
- 1986 – Barış Özbek, German-Turkish footballer
- 1986 – Alan Sheehan, Irish footballer
- 1986 – Ai Takahashi, Japanese singer and actress
- 1986 – Reggie Williams, American basketball player
- 1987 – Michael Crabtree, American football player
- 1987 – Tinchy Stryder, Ghanaian-English rapper and producer
- 1988 – Martin Fourcade, French biathlete
- 1988 – Diogo Salomão, Portuguese footballer
- 1989 – Jimmy Butler, American basketball player
- 1989 – Tony Finau, American golfer
- 1989 – Jesse James, American actor
- 1989 – Lee Jong-suk, South Korean actor and model
- 1989 – Alex Killorn, Canadian ice hockey player
- 1989 – Jonathon Simmons, American basketball player
- 1989 – Miriam Zetter, Mexican ten-pin bowler
- 1990 – Douglas Costa, Brazilian footballer
- 1990 – Petar Filipović, German-born Croatian footballer
- 1990 – Belinda Hocking, Australian backstroke swimmer
- 1990 – Cecilie Pedersen, Norwegian footballer
- 1991 – Dee Milliner, American football player
- 1991 – Nana, South Korean singer, actress and model
- 1991 – Shayne Topp, American actor and Smosh cast member
- 1992 – Connor Fields, American cyclist
- 1992 – Cassie Sharpe, Canadian freestyle skier
- 1992 – Zico, South Korean rapper
- 1993 – Brandon Brown, American race car driver
- 1994 – Brahim Darri, Dutch footballer
- 1994 – Gary Harris, American basketball player
- 1994 – Daniel O'Shaughnessy, Finnish footballer
- 1994 – Krasimir Stanoev, Bulgarian footballer
- 1995 – Jevon Carter, American basketball player
- 1995 – Deshaun Watson, American football player
- 1996 – Hugh Bernard, English cricketer
- 1996 – Myles Wright, English professional footballer
- 1997 – Benjamin Ingrosso, Swedish singer and songwriter
- 1997 – Dominic Solanke, English footballer
- 2000 – Han, South Korean rapper

== Deaths ==
=== Pre-1600 ===
- AD 23 – Drusus Julius Caesar, Roman son of Tiberius (born 13 BC)
- 258 – Cyprian, African bishop and saint (born 200)
- 407 – John Chrysostom, Byzantine archbishop and saint (born 347)
- 585 – Bidatsu, emperor of Japan (born 538)
- 619 – Yang You, emperor of the Sui Dynasty (born 605)
- 775 – Constantine V, Byzantine emperor (born 718)
- 786 – Al-Hadi, Abbasid caliph (born 764)
- 788 – Li Mian, Chinese judge, military general, musician, poet, and politician (born 717)
- 820 – Li Yong, chancellor of the Tang Dynasty
- 891 – Stephen V, pope of the Catholic Church
- 919 – Niall Glúndub, High King of Ireland
- 927 – Cele Dabhaill mac Scannal, Irish abbot
- 949 – Fujiwara no Tadahira, Japanese statesman (born 880)
- 1146 – Imad ad-Din Zengi, Syrian ruler (born 1087)
- 1164 – Emperor Sutoku of Japan (born 1119)
- 1214 – Albert Avogadro, Italian lawyer, patriarch, and saint (born 1149)
- 1321 – Dante Alighieri, Italian writer (born 1265)
- 1401 – Dobrogost of Nowy Dwór, Polish bishop (born 1355)
- 1404 – Albert IV, duke of Austria (born 1377)
- 1412 – Ingegerd Knutsdotter, Swedish abbess (born 1356)
- 1435 – John of Lancaster, 1st Duke of Bedford, English politician, Lord High Admiral (born 1389)
- 1487 – Mara Branković, Serbian princess (born 1416)
- 1523 – Pope Adrian VI (born 1459)
- 1538 – Henry III of Nassau-Breda (born 1483)

=== 1601–1900 ===
- 1605 – Jan Tarnowski, Polish archbishop (born 1550)
- 1613 – Thomas Overbury, English poet
- 1638 – John Harvard, English-American minister and philanthropist (born 1607)
- 1646 – Robert Devereux, 3rd Earl of Essex, English general and politician, Lord Lieutenant of Staffordshire (born 1591)
- 1712 – Giovanni Domenico Cassini, Italian-French mathematician, astronomer, and engineer (born 1625)
- 1715 – Dom Pérignon, French monk and priest (born 1638)
- 1743 – Nicolas Lancret, French painter (born 1690)
- 1749 – Richard Temple, 1st Viscount Cobham, English field marshal and politician, Lord Lieutenant of Buckinghamshire (born 1675)
- 1759 – Louis-Joseph de Montcalm, French general (born 1712)
- 1807 – George Townshend, 1st Marquess Townshend, English field marshal and politician, Lord Lieutenant of Ireland (born 1724)
- 1821 – Heinrich Kuhl, German naturalist and zoologist (born 1797)
- 1836 – Aaron Burr, American colonel and politician, 3rd Vice President of the United States (born 1756)
- 1851 – James Fenimore Cooper, American novelist, short story writer, and historian (born 1789)
- 1852 – Augustus Pugin, English architect and critic, designed Scarisbrick Hall (born 1812)
- 1852 – Arthur Wellesley, 1st Duke of Wellington, Irish-English field marshal and politician, Prime Minister of the United Kingdom (born 1769)
- 1862 – Charles Pearson, English lawyer and politician (born 1793)
- 1862 – Charles Lennox Richardson, English-Chinese merchant (born 1834)
- 1868 – Swami Virajanand Dandeesha, also known as the Blind Sage of Mathura, celebrated teacher of Arya Samaj founder, Dayanand Saraswati, a scholar and teacher of Sanskrit grammar and Vedic literature (born 1778)
- 1879 – Bernhard von Cotta, German geologist and author (born 1808)
- 1891 – Johannes Bosboom, Dutch painter (born 1817)
- 1898 – William Seward Burroughs I, American businessman, founded the Burroughs Corporation (born 1857)

=== 1901–present ===
- 1901 – William McKinley, American soldier, lawyer, and politician, 25th President of the United States (born 1843)
- 1905 – Pierre Savorgnan de Brazza, Italian-French explorer (born 1852)
- 1910 – Lombe Atthill, Northern Irish obstetrician and gynaecologist (born 1827)
- 1916 – José Echegaray, Spanish engineer, mathematician, and playwright, Nobel Prize laureate (born 1832)
- 1927 – Isadora Duncan, American-Russian dancer and choreographer (born 1877)
- 1931 – Tom Roberts, English-Australian painter and educator (born 1856)
- 1936 – Ossip Gabrilowitsch, Russian-American pianist and conductor (born 1878)
- 1936 – Lina Ódena, Spanish communist and miliciana (born 1911)
- 1936 – Irving Thalberg, American screenwriter and producer (born 1899)
- 1937 – Tomáš Garrigue Masaryk, Czech sociologist and politician, 1st President of Czechoslovakia (born 1850)
- 1942 – E. S. Gosney, American eugenicist and philanthropist, founded Human Betterment Foundation (born 1855)
- 1943 – Jacob Gens, head of the Vilnius Ghetto government (born 1903)
- 1951 – Fritz Busch, German conductor and director (born 1890)
- 1952 – John McPhee, Australian businessman and politician, 27th Premier of Tasmania (born 1874)
- 1959 – Wayne Morris, American actor, singer, and producer (born 1914)
- 1960 – M. Karagatsis, Greek author, playwright, and critic (born 1908)
- 1961 – Ernst Gustav Kühnert, Estonian-German architect and historian (born 1885)
- 1962 – Frederick Schule, American hurdler, football player, and coach (born 1879)
- 1965 – J. W. Hearne, English cricketer (born 1891)
- 1966 – Gertrude Berg, American actress and screenwriter (born 1899)
- 1966 – Hiram Wesley Evans, American Ku Klux Klan leader (born 1881)
- 1966 – Cemal Gürsel, Turkish general and politician, 4th President of Turkey (born 1895)
- 1975 – Walter Herbert, German-American conductor (born 1902)
- 1979 – Nur Muhammad Taraki, Afghan journalist and politician, 3rd President of Afghanistan (born 1917)
- 1981 – Furry Lewis, American singer-songwriter and guitarist (born 1899)
- 1982 – Christian Ferras, French violinist (born 1933)
- 1982 – John Gardner, American novelist, essayist, and critic (born 1933)
- 1982 – Bachir Gemayel, Lebanese commander and politician (born 1947)
- 1982 – Grace Kelly, American-Monegasque actress; Princess of Monaco (born 1929)
- 1984 – Janet Gaynor, American actress (born 1906)
- 1986 – Gordon McLendon, American broadcaster, founded the Liberty Broadcasting System (born 1921)
- 1989 – Pérez Prado, Cuban-Mexican singer-songwriter and pianist (born 1916)
- 1991 – Julie Bovasso, American actress and playwright (born 1930)
- 1991 – Russell Lynes, American historian, photographer, and author (born 1910)
- 1992 – August Komendant, Estonian-American engineer and academic (born 1906)
- 1992 – Paul Martin Sr., Canadian lawyer and politician, 12th Canadian Minister of Foreign Affairs (born 1903)
- 1993 – Clayton Young, American long-distance runner
- 1994 – Marika Krevata, Greek actress (born 1910)
- 1995 – Maurice K. Goddard, American colonel and politician (born 1912)
- 1996 – Juliet Prowse, Indian-South African actress, singer, and dancer (born 1937)
- 1998 – Yang Shangkun, Chinese politician, and 4th president of China (born 1907)
- 1999 – Charles Crichton, English director, producer, and screenwriter (born 1910)
- 1999 – Giannos Kranidiotis, Greek politician and diplomat (born 1947)
- 2000 – Beah Richards, American actress (born 1920)
- 2000 – Jerzy Giedroyc, Belarusian-Polish soldier and activist (born 1906)
- 2001 – Stelios Kazantzidis, Greek singer and guitarist (born 1931)
- 2002 – LaWanda Page, American actress (born 1920)
- 2003 – Jerry Fleck, American actor and director (born 1947)
- 2003 – Garrett Hardin, American ecologist and author (born 1915)
- 2003 – John Serry Sr., American accordion player and composer (born 1915)
- 2005 – William Berenberg, American physician and academic (born 1915)
- 2005 – Vladimir Volkoff, French soldier and author (born 1932)
- 2005 – Robert Wise, American director and producer (born 1914)
- 2006 – Mickey Hargitay, Hungarian-American bodybuilder and actor (born 1926)
- 2006 – Esme Melville, Australian actress (born 1918)
- 2007 – Jacques Martin, French television host and producer (born 1933)
- 2007 – Robert Savoie, Canadian opera singer (born 1927)
- 2008 – Hyman Golden, American businessman, co-founded Snapple (born 1923)
- 2009 – Keith Floyd, English chef and author (born 1943)
- 2009 – Henry Gibson, American actor (born 1935)
- 2009 – Jody Powell, American diplomat, White House Press Secretary (born 1943)
- 2009 – Patrick Swayze, American actor, singer, and dancer (born 1952)
- 2011 – Malcolm Wallop, American politician (born 1933)
- 2012 – Jacques Antoine, French game show producer, created The Crystal Maze and Fort Boyard (born 1924)
- 2012 – Eduardo Castro Luque, Mexican businessman and politician (born 1963)
- 2012 – Winston Rekert, Canadian actor and director (born 1949)
- 2012 – Kan Yuet-keung, Hong Kong banker, lawyer, and politician (born 1913)
- 2013 – Maksym Bilyi, Ukrainian footballer (born 1989)
- 2013 – Osama El-Baz, Egyptian soldier and diplomat (born 1931)
- 2013 – Faith Leech, Australian swimmer (born 1941)
- 2014 – Tony Auth, American illustrator (born 1942)
- 2014 – Peter Gutteridge, New Zealand singer-songwriter and guitarist (born 1961)
- 2014 – E. Jennifer Monaghan, English-American historian, author, and academic (born 1933)
- 2015 – Davey Browne, Australian boxer (born 1986)
- 2015 – Fred DeLuca, American businessman, co-founded Subway (born 1947)
- 2015 – Martin Kearns, English drummer (born 1977)
- 2015 – Corneliu Vadim Tudor, Romanian journalist and politician (born 1949)
- 2018 – Ethel Johnson, American professional wrestler (born 1935)
- 2018 – Zienia Merton, British actress (born 1945)
- 2021 – Norm Macdonald, Canadian comedian and actor (born 1959)
- 2024 – Jaber Mubarak Al-Sabah, Kuwaiti royal and politician, 7th Prime Minister of Kuwait (born 1942)
- 2024 – Otis Davis, American sprinter (born 1932)
- 2025 – Jim Edgar, American politician, 38th Governor of Illinois (born 1946)
- 2025 – Ricky Hatton, British professional boxer (born 1978)
- 2026 – Pete Byrne, English singer-songwriter (born 1952)
- 2026 – Bob Mackie, American fashion designer (born 1939)
- 2026 – Peter Max, German-American artist (born 1937)
- 2026 – Luděk Mikloško, Czech footballer (born 1961)

== Holidays and observances ==
- Christian feast day:
  - Aelia Flaccilla (Eastern Orthodox Church)
  - Albert of Vercelli
  - Cormac mac Cuilennáin (or of Cashel)
  - Crescentius of Rome
  - Feast of the Cross (Christianity)
    - Elevation of the Holy Cross (Eastern Orthodox)
  - Lord of Miracles of Buga
  - Gabriel-Taurin Dufresse (one of the Martyr Saints of China)
  - Maternus of Cologne
  - Notburga
  - September 14 (Eastern Orthodox liturgics)
- Engineer's Day (Romania)
- Hindi Day (Hindi-speaking states of India)
- Mobilized Servicemen Day (Ukraine)
- San Jacinto Day (Nicaragua)
