= Our Lady of the Mountain =

Religious icon in the Roman Catholic Church, especially in South America

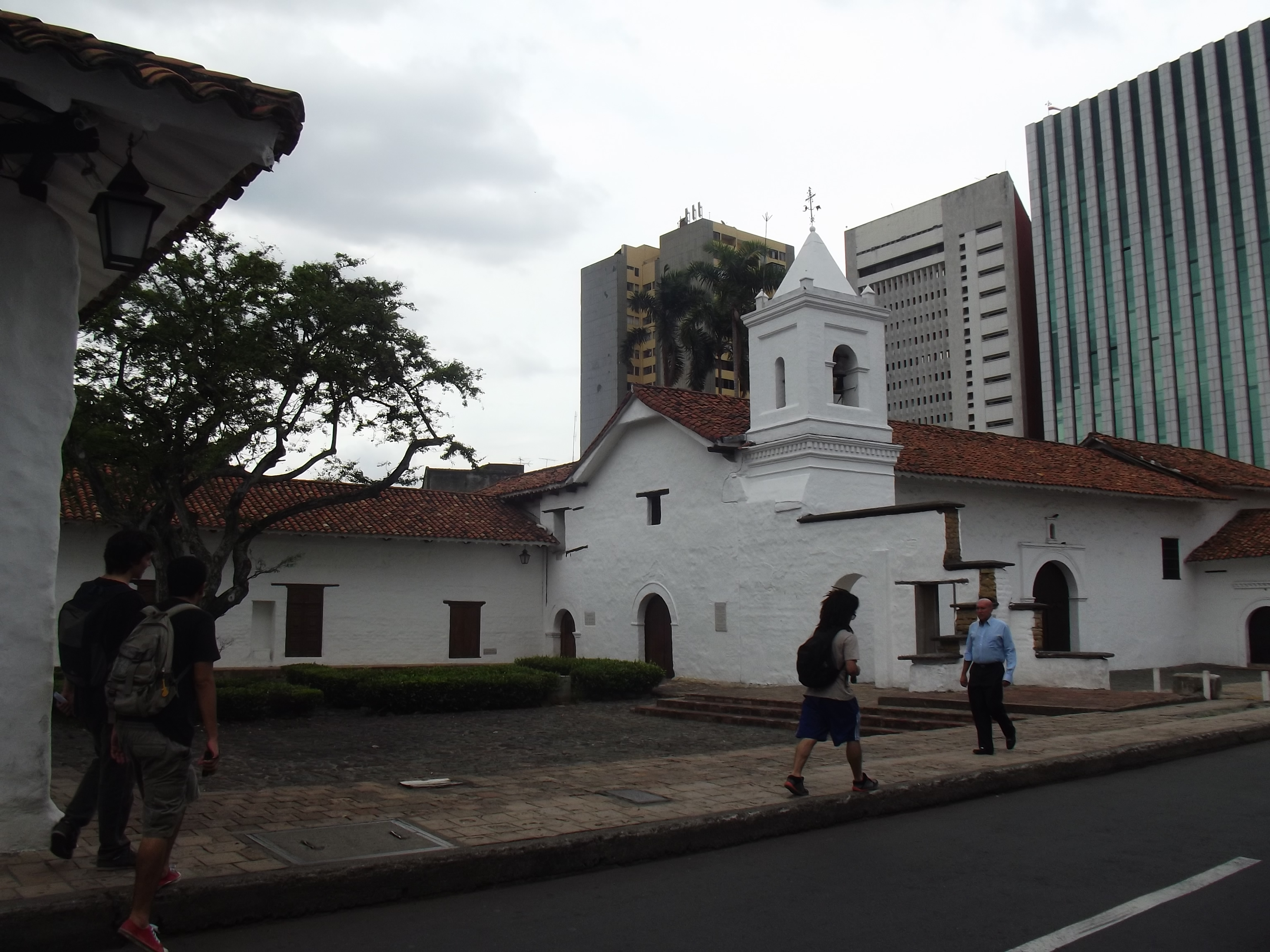
Street view of the permanent Chapel built to honour Our Lady of the Mountain, in the town of La Merced.

The image of Our Lady of the Mountain originated in Colombia and the region of the Cauca Valley in particular, where the city of Guadalajara de Buga is located. This Acheiropoita is a well known figure that has been officially recognized by the Roman Catholic Church. The image has been called with different names since then by the Hispanic people, initially known as Our Lady of the Rosary, and even also as Our lady of the Favor (Nuestra Senora de la Merced). This Virgin has strong links to the Native Andean people and with well known Spanish Marian images. At present it is venerated with the name of Our lady of the Remedies, a name given by the Mercedarian friars after a Virgin of the Cantabric region in Spain. It is linked to the advocation of Our Lady of the Remedies (Nuestra Señora de los Remedios).

== Background and History ==
The image depicts baby Jesus being held by the Virgin Mary, who is approximately drawn as 1 metre (3 ft 3 in), whilst holding fruit in her right hand. Some critics argue that she is grasping onto a pomegranate, which is a symbol of the name originally given by the Spaniards to the country, New Kingdom of Grenada. Others believe it is not really a pomegranate, but a blooming flower of Quereme - that is only typical of those mountains.

=== Origins of the Apparition and Image ===
The original region where this Marian apparition took place known as El Queremal, known as the Love me field, which comes from the name of endemic flowers called Quiereme (love me). It is still considered as a sanctuary by the peasants in the town and is still known as Our Lady of The Mountain.

The original statue of Our Lady was venerated by the indigenous peoples before it was to be discovered by the Spaniards, who then called her simply as The Queen of the Mountain or Our Lady of Queremal. She appeared miraculously next to a water fall, today called the mantle of the Virgin, in the middle of the peaks of the western Andes, surrounded by dense tropical vegetation in the harbor of Buenaventura, in the city of Santiago de Cali, located in the Inter Andean valley of the Cauca's river.

It is claimed that she appeared miraculously in the 1570s carved as a natural formation in white Quartz stone at the most Western Colombian Andes, called The Choco mountain range, close to the Pacific. Today the original white solid rock material is in its front covered by colonial paint artisanal work that was applied by artists trying to give to the image a more Spanish colonial look.

This Virgin was brought around 1580 from its original apparition place, the Queremal valley, Where she was venerated as the Queen of the Mountain, to Santiago de Cali by the Priest Miguel de Soto who decided to travel to the area to confirm the miracle but also alarmed by the possibility that the native aborigines would be taken part in a pagan cult praising to an idol. The colonial chronicles say that amazingly the image disappeared from the Church twice and appeared again back in the same original place in the middle of the mountains where it was originally found, about more than 35 miles distant to the west, for the perplexity of the people, causing great confusion among the monks.

The Superior nun of the convent that was hosting the image had a vision where Our Lady wanted to erect a chapel in the temple in her honor, decorated with figures of Aborigines and native plants, in order to remain in Cali. As soon as the chapel was finished the Virgin was again moved to there from the mountains, and she was never return to them.

== Legacy of the Image ==
Since those colonial times, her image is in a permanent place of exhibition and adoration. She is located in an altar inside the traditional La Merced Church at the downtown of the city.

This figure of Virgin in Maternity was crowned as Queen of the Colombian Pacific in solemn ceremony carried out by Pope John Paul II in his visit to Santiago de Cali of 1986 and at the 1971 Panamerican Games Stadium. The official temple was erected in the 1950s to commemorate the Bolivarian countries Eucharistic congress.

== Gallery ==
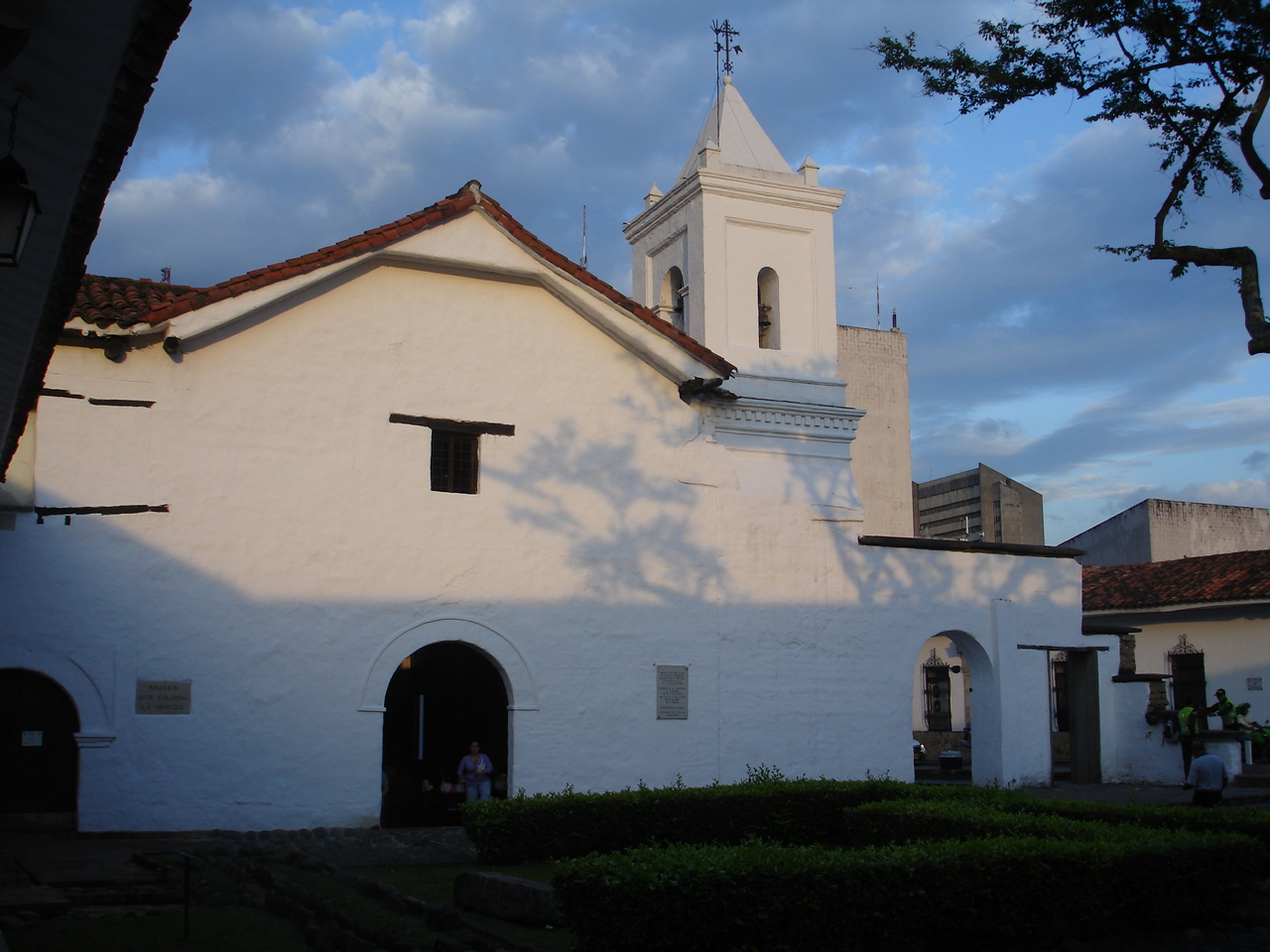
Chapel erected in the Honor of Our Lady of the Mountain.

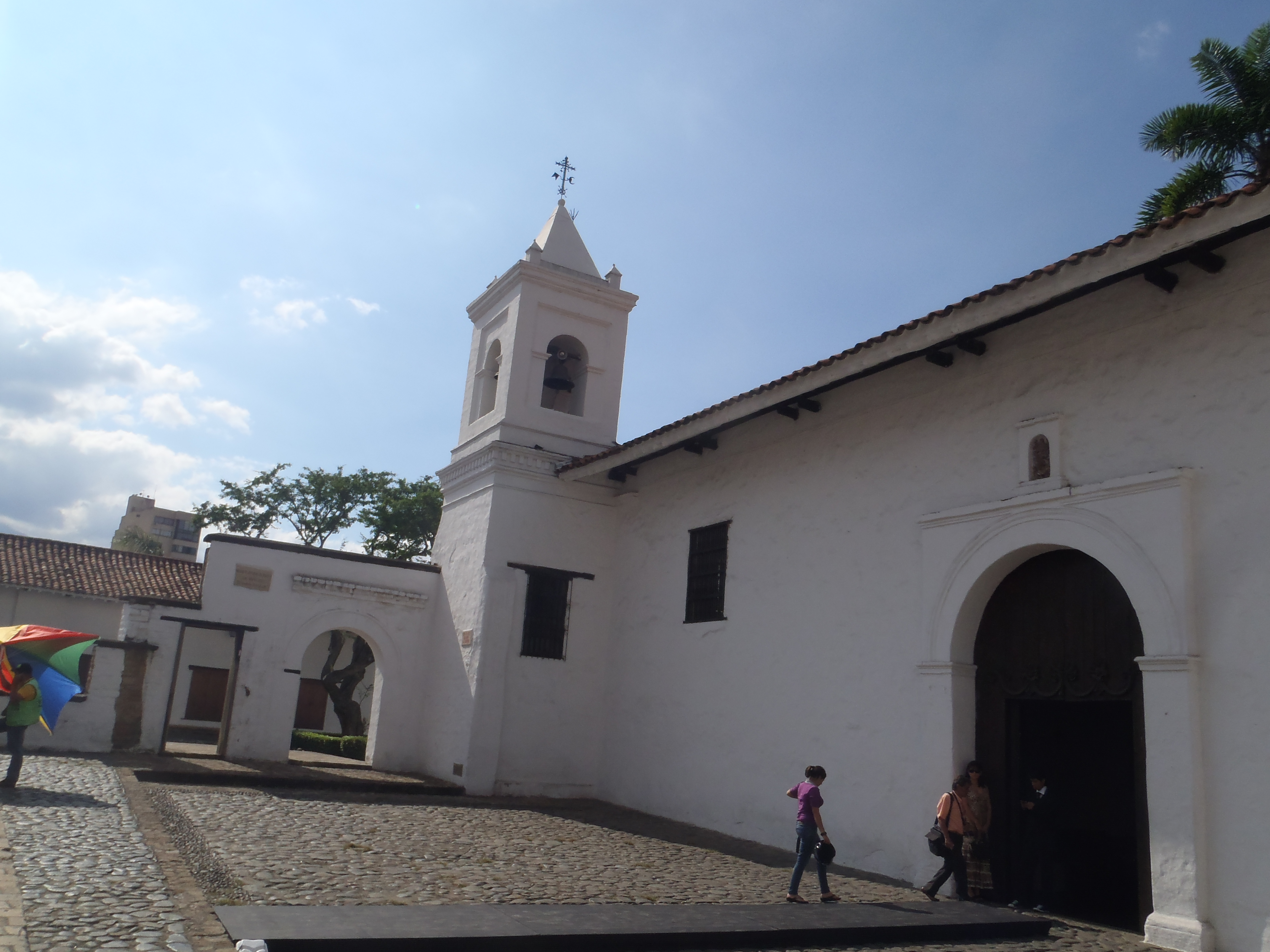
Side view of the Chapel erected in the Honor of Our Lady of the Mountain.

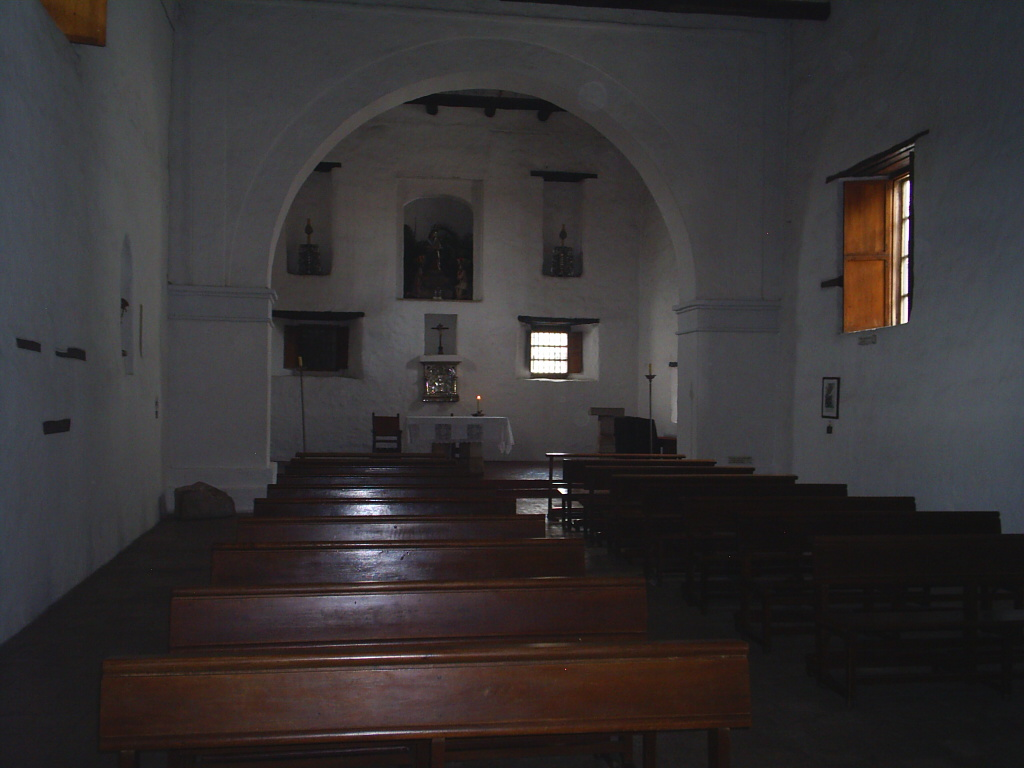
Inside the Chapel erected in the Honor of Our Lady of the Mountain.

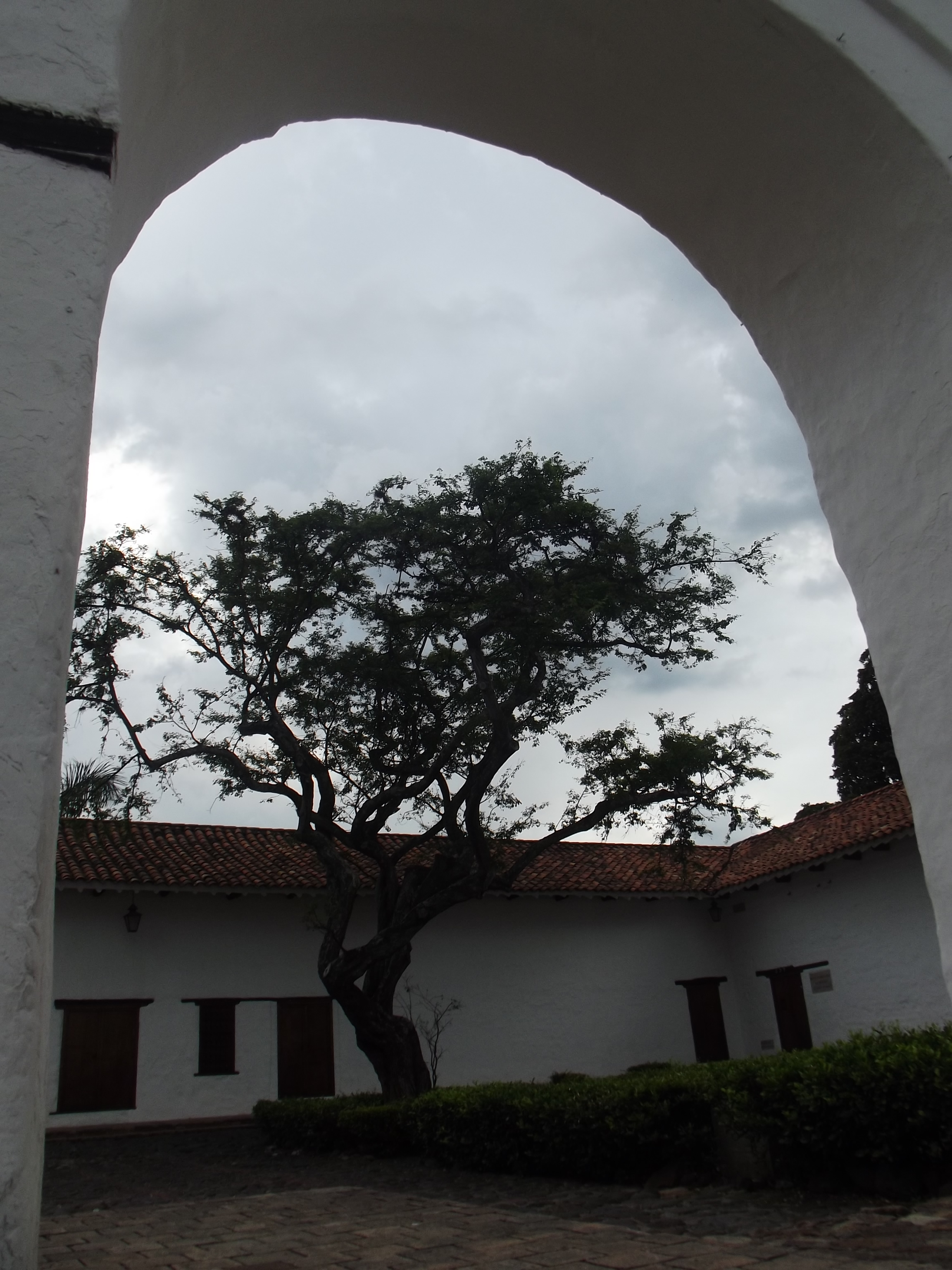
The Chapel is located in the neighborhood of La Merced.

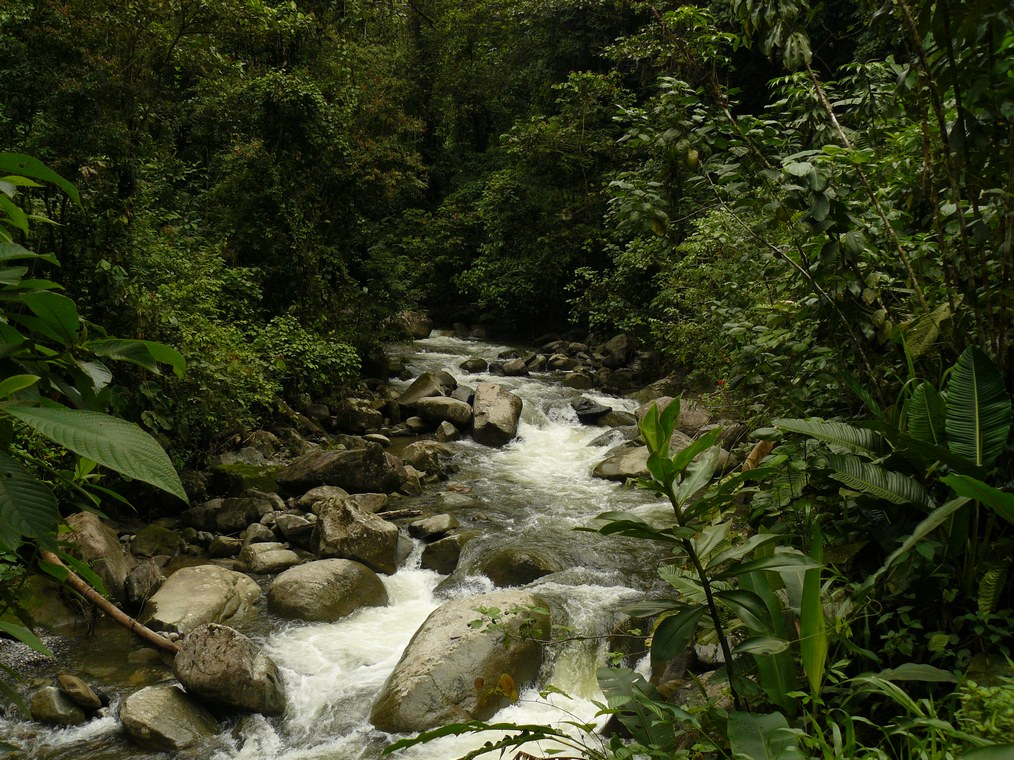
Nearby river of Anchicaya where the apparition of Our Lady of the Mountain was seen.

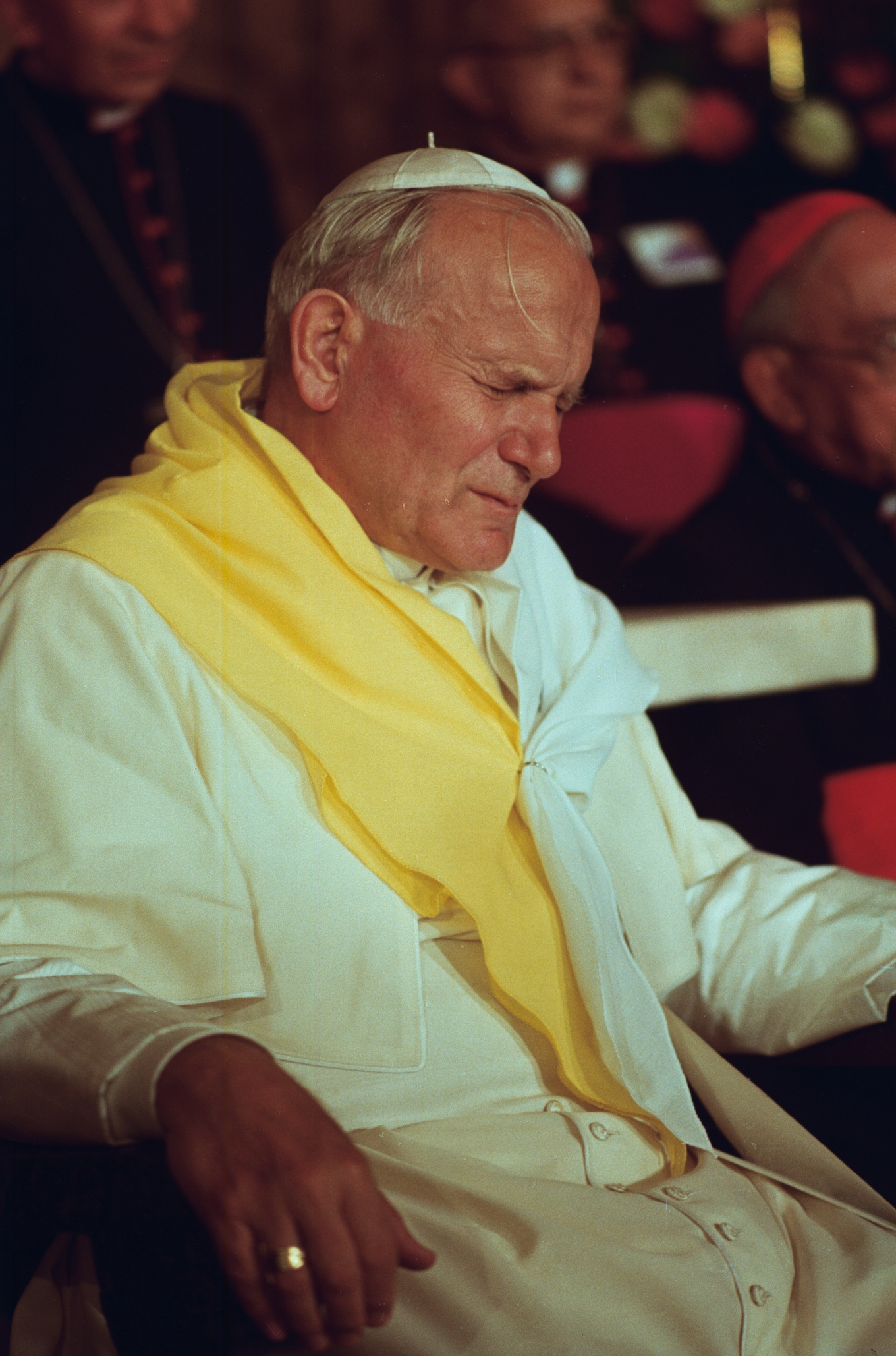
Pope John Paul II in his visit to Santiago de Cali of 1986.

== See also ==
- Festivities of Our Lady of the Remedies
- Lord of Miracles of Buga
- Christology
- Our Lady of Guadalupe
