= Our Lord of the Miracles of Buga =

Statue of Jesus in Buga, Colombia

Coordinates: 19°29′04″N 99°07′02″W

Our Lord of the Miracles of Buga Nuestro Señor de Los Milagros de Buga
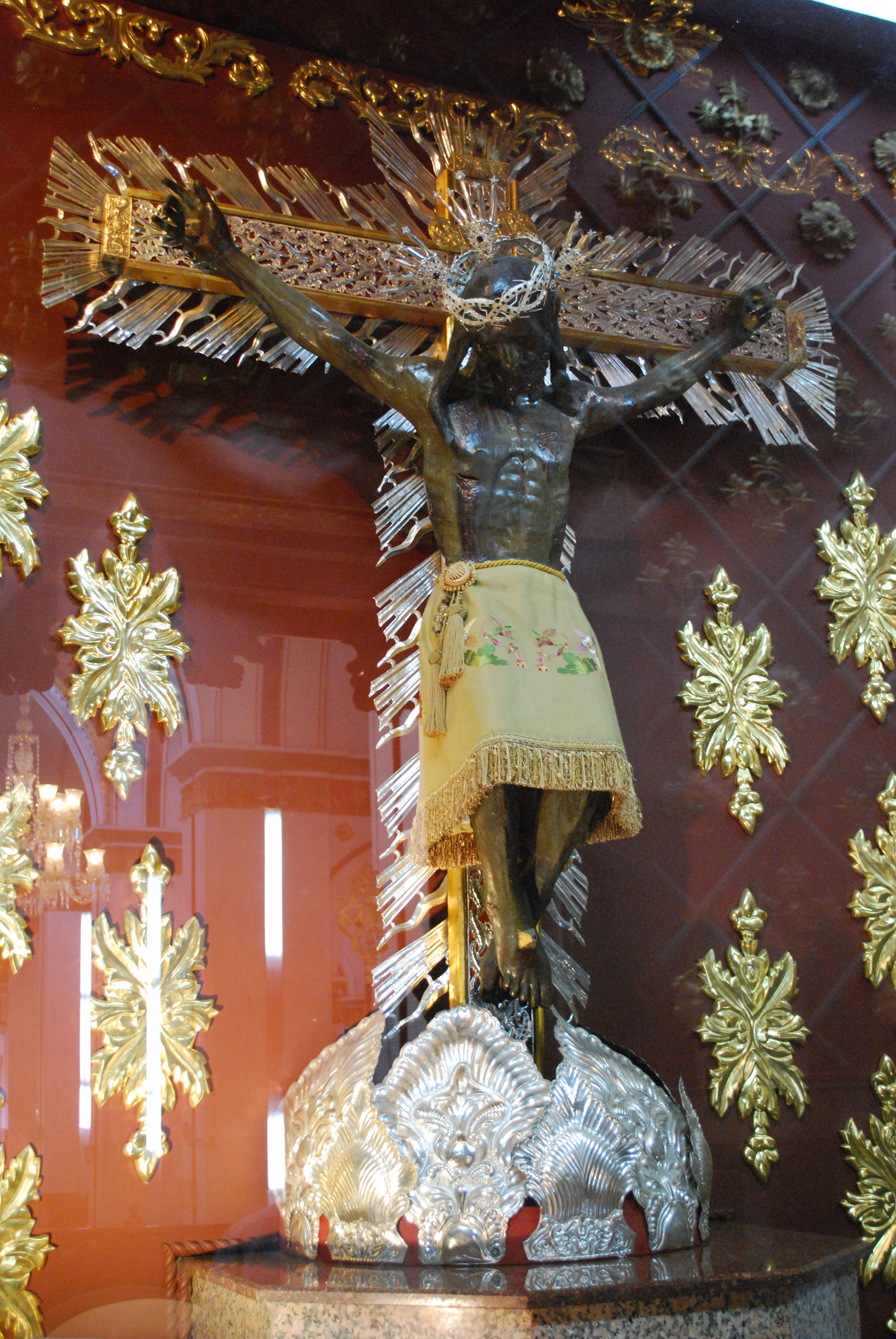

Lord of Miracles
- Venerated in: Roman Catholic Church
- Major shrine: Basilica of Our Lord of Miracles, Buga City, Colombia
- Feast: 14 September
- Attributes: Crucified Christ in agony, gilded crown of thorns, silver and platinum cross, embroidered clothes
- Patronage: Miracles, Colombian Armed Forces, desperate situations, impossible causes

Our Lord of the Miracles of Buga (Spanish: Nuestro Señor de Los Milagros de Buga), also known as the Lord of the Miracles (Spanish: Senor de Los Milagros), is a statue of Jesus Christ in the form of a crucifix, said to have come into existence spontaneously and without the work of human hands. This type of miraculous icon is known as acheiropoieta. The Lord of Miracles appeared in the 16th century in what is now Buga, Colombia.

It is also the name of the shrine in which the statue is located. This shrine falls under the Redemptorist order and is located in Buga, Valle del Cauca, in the southwest of Colombia.

This basilica is the most famous Catholic non-Marian sanctuary in the Americas. The Redemptorist monastic community that curates Our Lord of the Miracles also promotes the veneration of a reproduction of the Cretan icon of our Lady of Perpetual help.

== Apparition of the Lord of the Waters ==
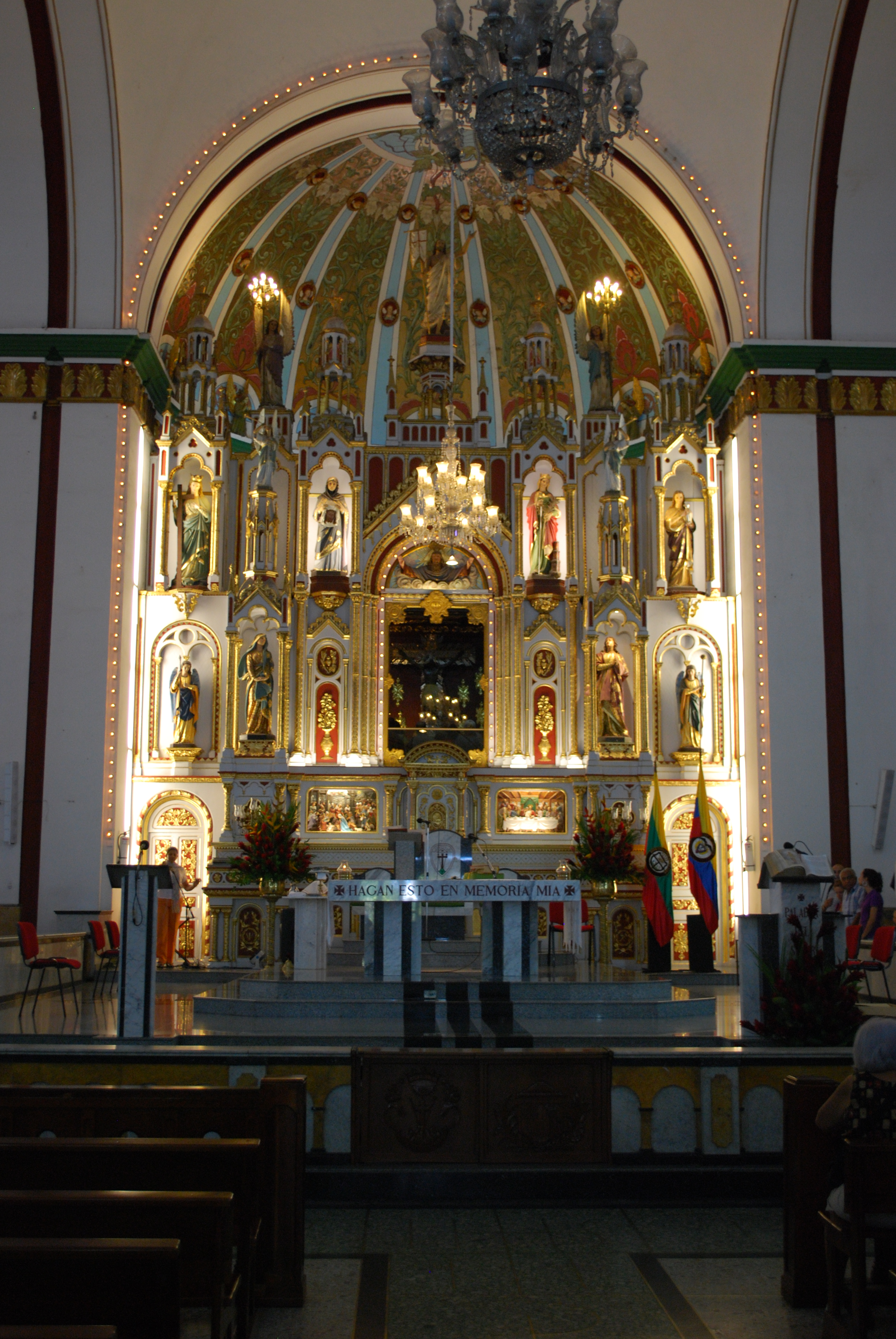
Image of the Christ of Miracles on the main altar of the basilica

In September 1573, an indigenous woman, who made her living as a laundress, noticed a small but brilliant object that was carried by the current in the middle of the Guadalajara River. She caught it up and discovered that it was a tiny crucifix. Happy with her find, when she returned home, she fashioned an altar for the small crucifix using a common wooden box.

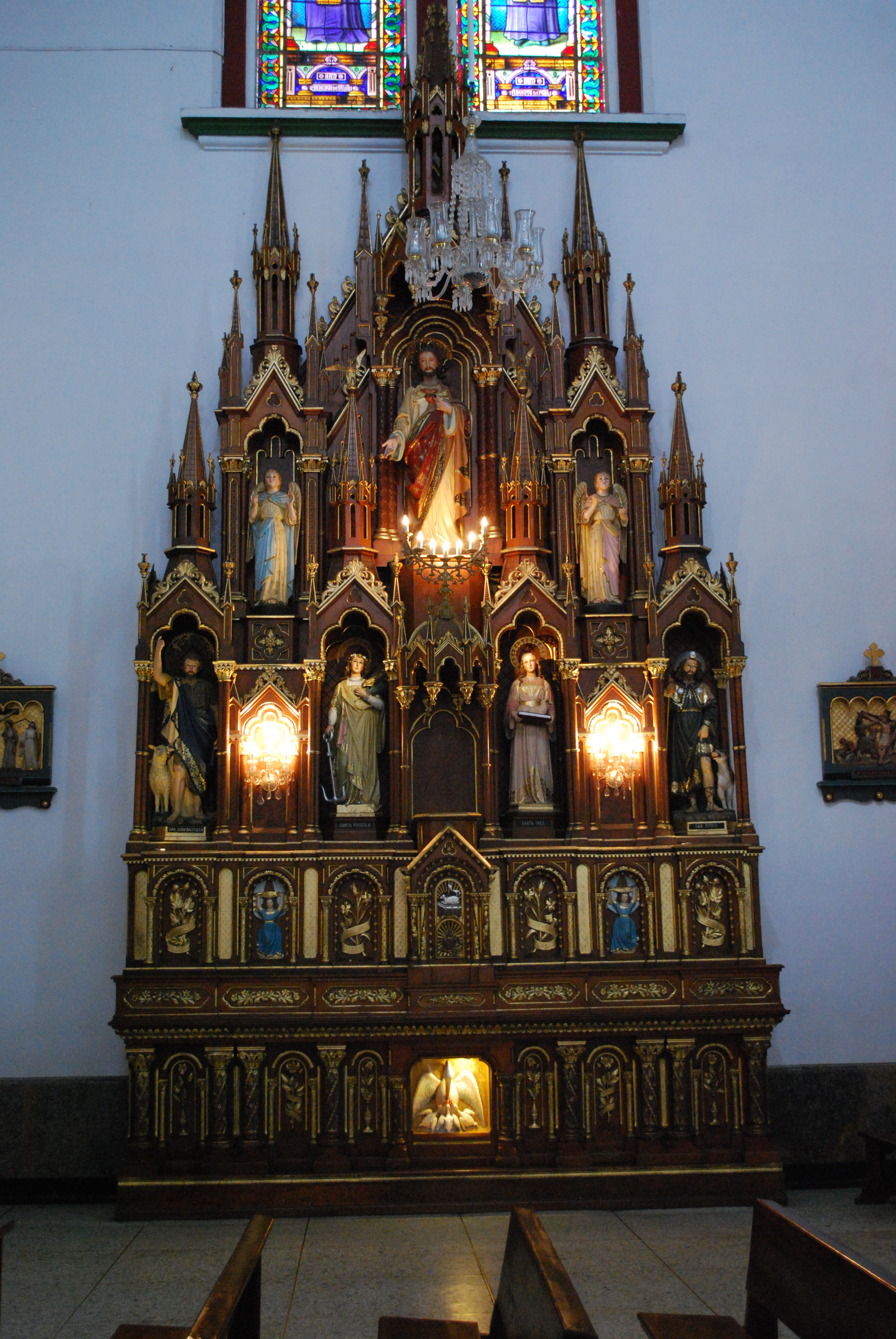

According to tradition, one night the diminutive wooden crucifix began to grow into a life-size image of the Christ. News of this spread along all the Cauca River valley and many people started to gather at the place, where a hermitage was built, turning the woman's humble house into a sanctuary.

A wealthy family from the region decided to donate lands to build a great church, the first hermitage to venerate the holy crucifix on the site where it had first been discovered. The crucifix had already grown from the pocket size to nearly the height of a human person and was already called the Lord of Miracles. A great obstacle to facilitate the peregrination to the sanctuary was that there was no bridge for the visiting worshippers to cross the river. According to the accounts dating from this period, after some collective acts of prayer during the rainy season, a natural phenomenon took place which resolved the problem caused by the lack of a bridge. During some strong rains the river suddenly and spontaneously diverted from its original path. It began flowing in such a way that a new river bed was formed that was many meters away from the old one. From this moment on, the hermitage was located on the same side of the river as the city of Buga.

== History ==
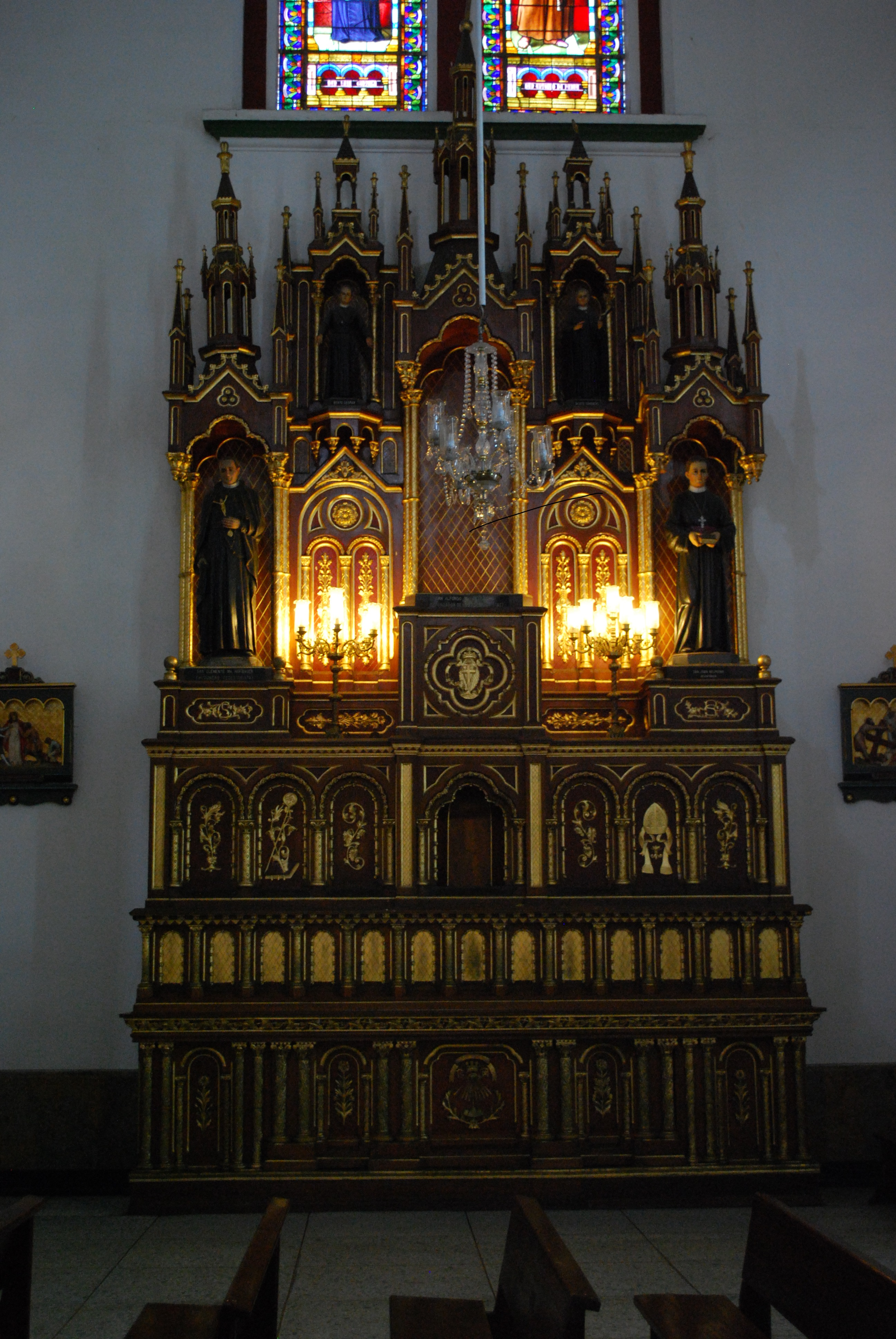

For the first fifty years of the veneration of the Lord of Miracles, the image was kept in a small hermitage aside the river in the place it was originally found by the elderly laundress. It suffered a gradual darkening that was attributed to the smog of candles used to enlighten the place. Also the cross was deteriorated since many people had broken off bits of the crucifix as personal mementos. By 1605 a special inspector of the Roman Catholic Church was sent by the Bishop of Popayan, who was worried about the popular stories concerning the miraculously appeared Christ. He feared an accusation of schism by the Holy Inquisition, and using the excuse that he found the quality of the image so degraded by the handling of the pilgrims who had broken off piece, so he decided to burn it. There was a special attempt to destroy the crucifix by a great fire. But the crucifix didn't burn. Instead it transpired a lot of oily liquid which the devotees wiped up with small pieces of cotton.

The pieces of cotton which had touched the image while it was in the fire reportedly produced many miraculous cures when they were used to touch ill people of the region. This led to more fame for the sanctuary. As a consequence of the attempt to burn the image, the skin of Christ turned from light olive color to a darker one that it currently has. In September–October 1757 the Bishop of Popayán, Diego del Corro, visited Guadalajara de Buga, to witness personally the existence of the image, and decided to collect all documents concerning it so as to prepare a case to be sent to Lima, Peru, the official site of the Inquisition tribunal.

From the 1700s to the 1900s, three different hermitages were built at the site. Since this is the most seismically active region of western Colombia, they were all damaged by earthquakes. By 1875, the temple had experienced so much damage that the Bishop of Popayan brought in the Redemptorist friars as caretakers.

== Basilica ==
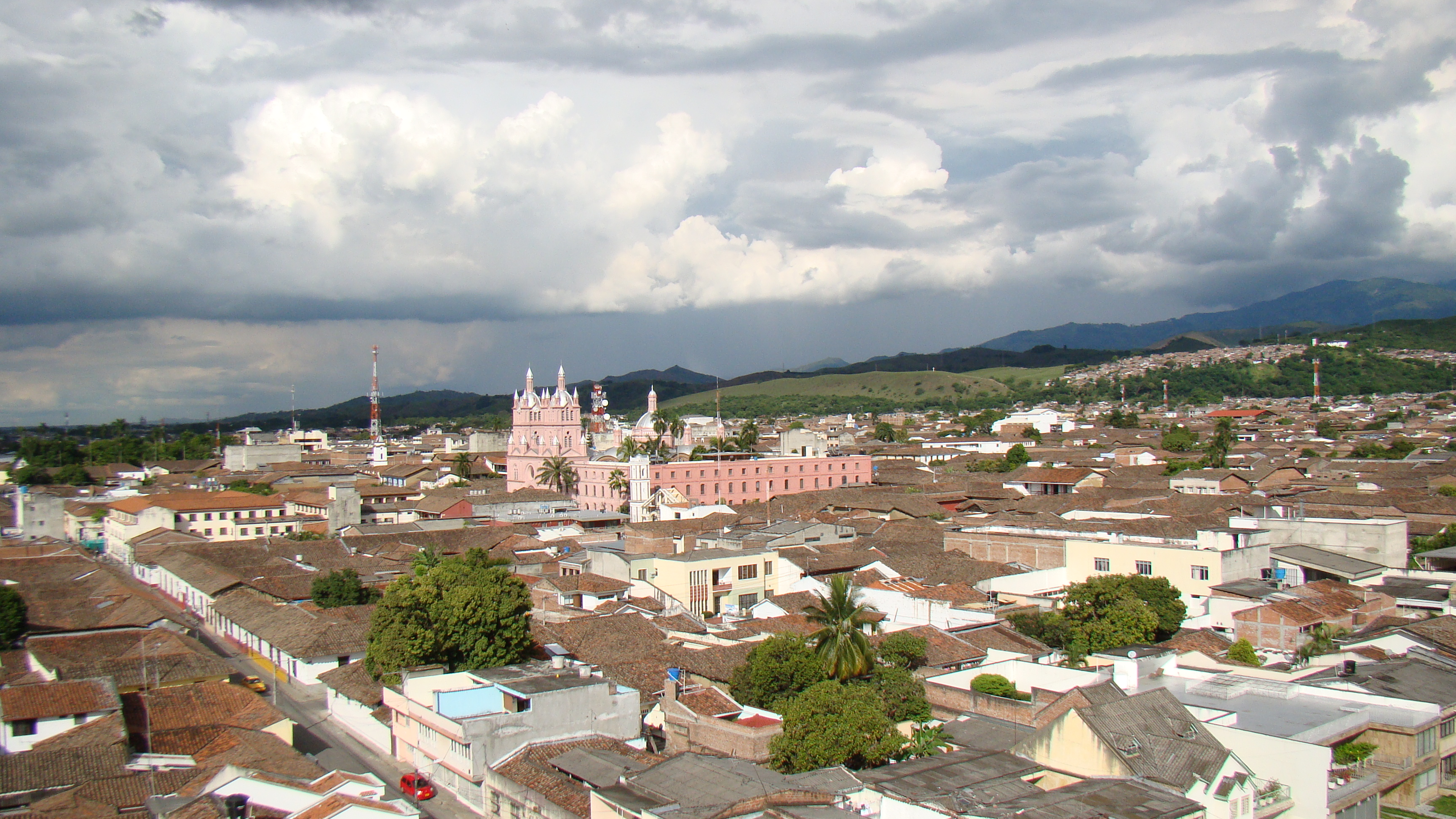

Shortly thereafter, many donations from devotees were collected towards the construction of the basilica. Four million brickets were manufactured in the city and twelve thousand arrobas of calcium used to paste them to build the walls. The work was carried out by volunteers from all over the region under the supervision of the priests. The formal inauguration of the temple took place on 2 August 1907 with a solemn blessing ceremony in the presence of the Apostolic Nuncio, representing the Holy See, Monseñor Ragonesi and the new Archbishop of Popayán, Monseñor Antonio Arboleda, together with thousands of devotees from all over the country.

On 29 April 1937, a man tried to destroy the image with a machete. The image was not destroyed but the attack opened a gap in the right side of the torso, showing that it was not carved in wood as many believed but in some kind of mud.

On Sunday, 4 March 1956, a priest celebrating the Mass suffered an assassination attempt, but the dagger used by the attacker fractured in the air in three pieces in the presence of many witnesses, a fact that received a lot of coverage of the press. The three pieces of the weapon are still permanently exhibited in the museum of the basilica.

On 3 February 1969, another person attacked the image causing some damage to it, so an artisan was called to repair it and it was he who confirmed that the Christ is not carved but made of mud and grass similar to that on the shores of the Guadalajara river. At present the Christ, is protected behind bulletproof glass.

=== Unknown identity of the finder and first printed accounts ===
A witness mentioned in ecclesiastic documents of that time of the miracle of the fire in 1605, when the Bishop of Popayan ordered the destruction of the image, there had been a lady named Luisa Sanchez. This could refer to the washing woman who had originally found the crucifix or possibly to one of her surviving relatives.

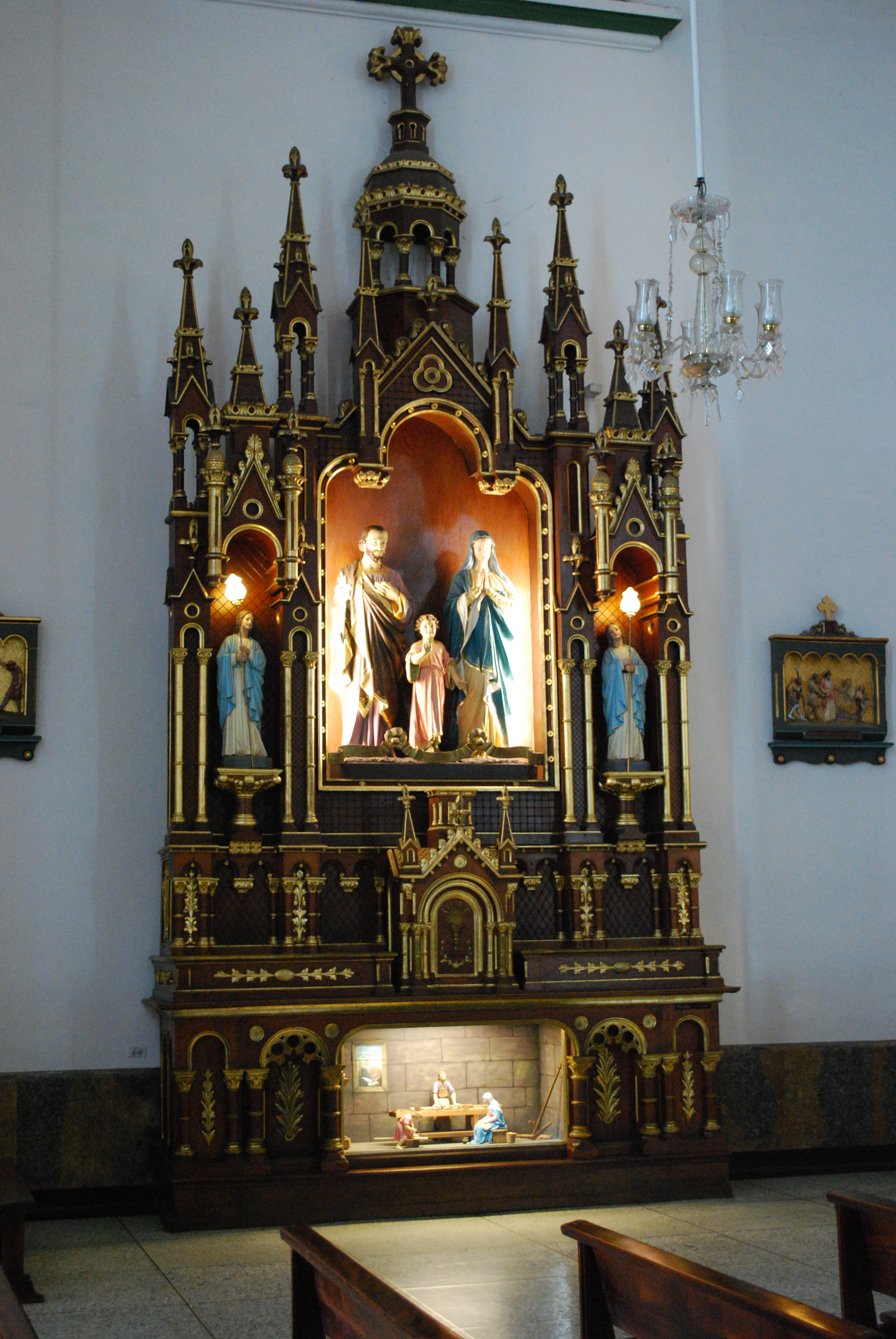

A testimony given to one Inquisition Visitador (inspector), in 1665, corresponds to Doña Luisa de la Espada, a daughter of one of the Buga Patriarchs that donated the money to build the first hermitage. According to her sworn statement as recorded in the archives, she swore she had seen the crucifix placed in the fire but not burning, only transpiring an oily liquid.

During the 16th and the 17th centuries the image was known among the common people of the Cauca's Valley as The Lord of the waters, but the increasing fame of the miracles obtained by its devotion changed to The Lord of Miracles.

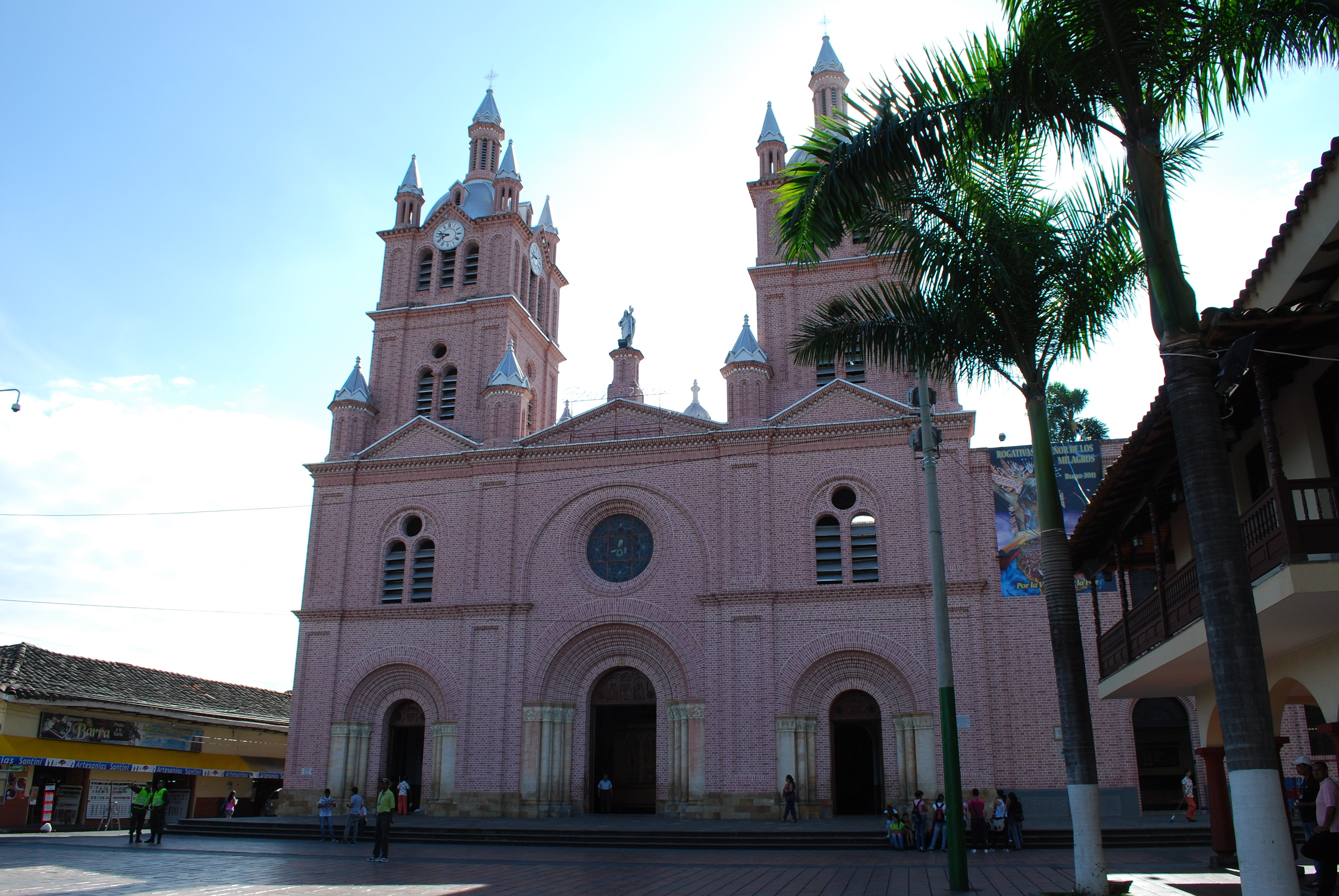
Basilica del Senor de los Milagros de Guadalajara de Buga

Among the first printed official accounts is the full story of the Miracle of the Guadalajara river written by Franciscan Friar Francisco G. Rodríguez in 1819, the same year Colombia became independent from Spain. There are records showing that General Simon Bolivar visited Buga among the places he traveled across in his independence campaign for the south west of the country after the battle of Boyacá in his route to Equator. This unique Christ, modeled from materials of the western Colombian Andes receives its name from the region of Buga. During the colonial times the region was populated by the aborigines called Bugas, who were violently suppressed by the Spaniards when they arrived in that region in the early 16th century.

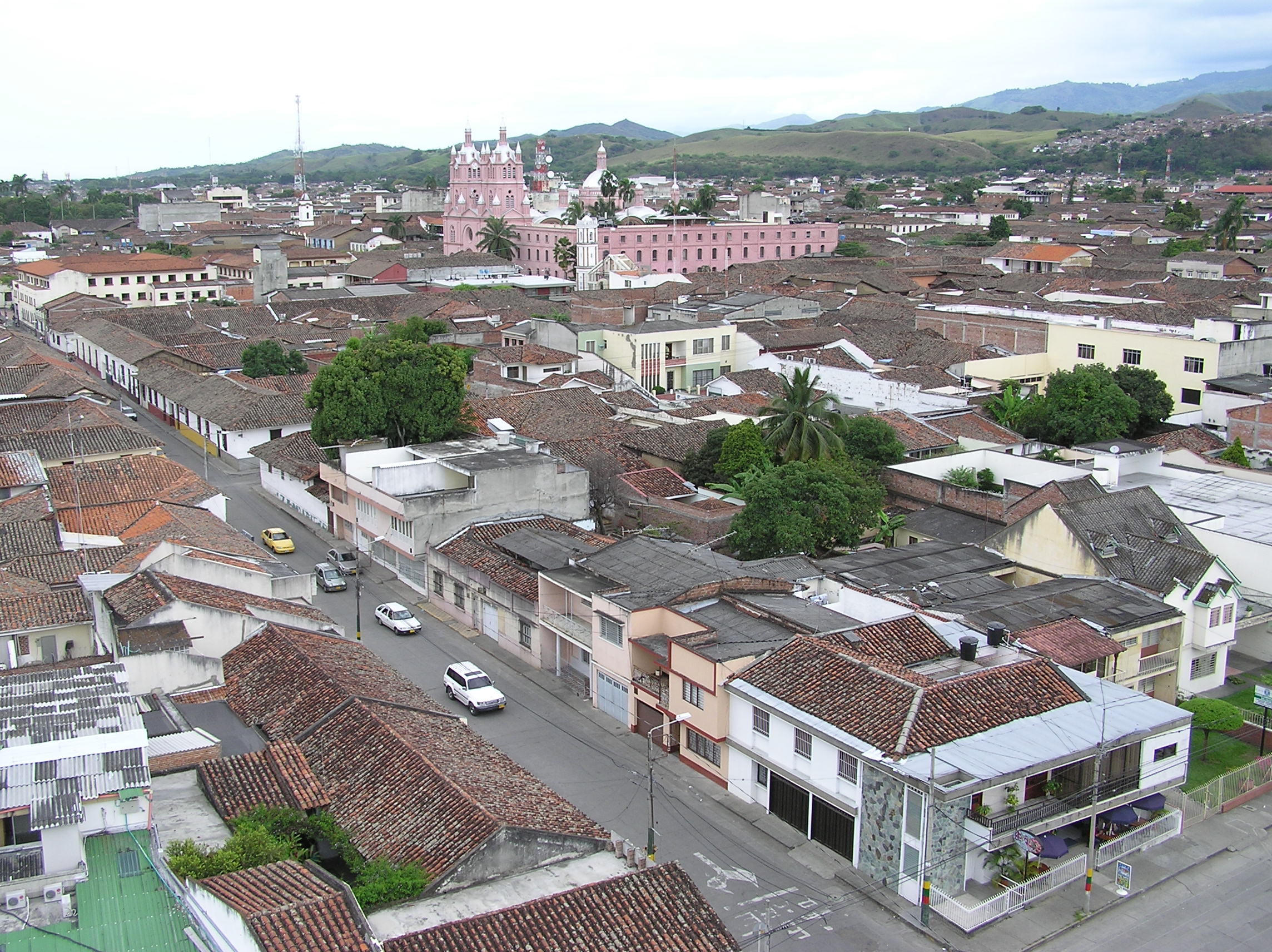

In 1783 the rector of the Popayan seminar, and also the director of the sanctuary of Buga, with the approval of the Bishop, sent a report to Rome containing an extensive list of miracles of the healings received by the devotees. Pope Pius VI responded to this communication with 22 “breves perpetuos”, special instructions in which he granted generous indulgences to all the pilgrims that attended the sanctuary. The copy of this pontifical document is filed in the archives of the basilica.

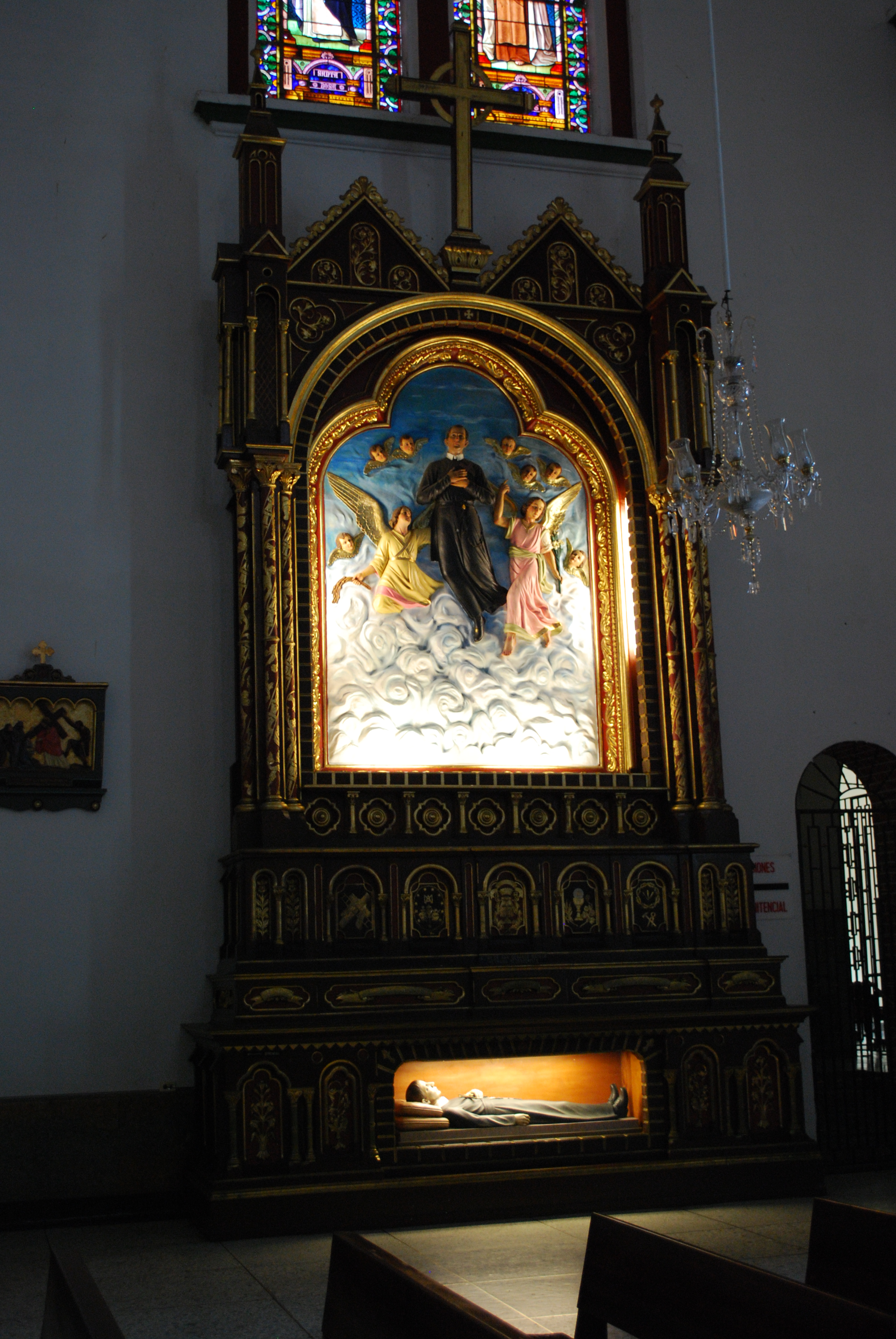

== The image as artifact ==
=== Iconographic description ===
The image is a full-length representation of a copper coloured skinned Christ, a long haired young man with high cheek-bones and cleft chin covered by curled beard. His features are visibly altered by the torture suffered in the agony of the Passion, and dreadlocks simply parted in the middle framing his face. He is falling, hanged from the cross, with the hands and feet pierced by the strong nails. His head is slightly inclined. He has a suffering but at the same time very serene expression in his eyes.

This Christ image didn't really have a crown of thorns already modeled on it, so the devotees added a diadem, made of plants of the Andes, to the head, but without thorns, and fixed the rays of gold with precious gems on it. Apparently the figure is naked, but it has been dressed along the centuries with fine embroidered cloths that are periodically changed and cover the upper legs and belly. His head has been partially covered by a diadem of plants used to make baskets or hampers in the Andean artistry and decorated with fine rays in gold and with precious stones that were donated by the devotees in gratitude for the miracles attributed to Christ in their prayer to Our Lord of Miracles.

Its entire cross is framed by waiving flames made of silver and platinum, possibly added in between the 17th or 18th century that may at the same time represent its divine nature or remembrance of the miracle of the fire, when the image was tested by being put in a bonfire by the orders of the inquisition inspector. The base of the cross has a garden of tropical flowers made of platinum, silver and gold, showing the image also as hanging from a tree of life. All these additions in noble metals follow a millennial custom to offer votive elements in thanksgiving to God for the miracles received.

=== Physical description ===
Although it has all the aspects of a wooden Colonial Christ, the figure has been discovered recently to be made actually as if modeled like a very fine ceramic, with porcelain quality, from a mixture of very fine highly plastic mud and grass that correspond to the plants found on the shores of the Guadalajara river until present. There are no precedents of this same quality of porcelain work in all the art craft of the Americas. It represents a singularity never repeated again either in the Pre-Hispanic or the Colonial religious art of not only Colombia but any other place in the entire Andean region of South America.

The original color of the figure is of mysterious origin, since it resembles human skin, and it is possible that it was protected subsequently with layers of varnish for religious figures used in colonial times by artisans hired to either repair or protect the figure, although there are no records of such repairs in the church archives.

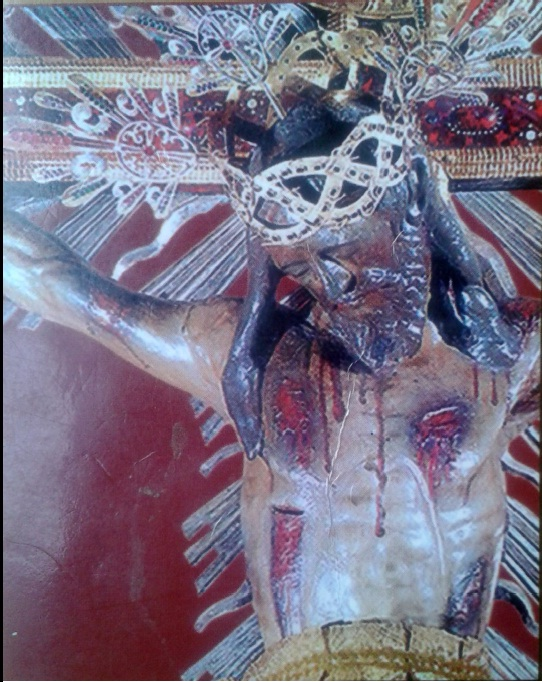

The Lord of Miracles of Guadalajara of Buga has at present the size of a short adult man (1.30 m, about 4.5 ft). It has a distinctive look that is not really European, due to the relative dark color of his skin, but definitively of a man of middle east, resembling a lot the depictions of Christ from the Holy Mandylion and Keramion, or the mount Sinai monastery:

=== Technical analyses ===
On 5 October 2006, a team of specialists used four different complementary technologies to analyze the artifact: X rays, ultraviolet rays, pigment, and stratigraphic analysis. The analyses of the image certified its incredibly well preserved condition after several centuries.

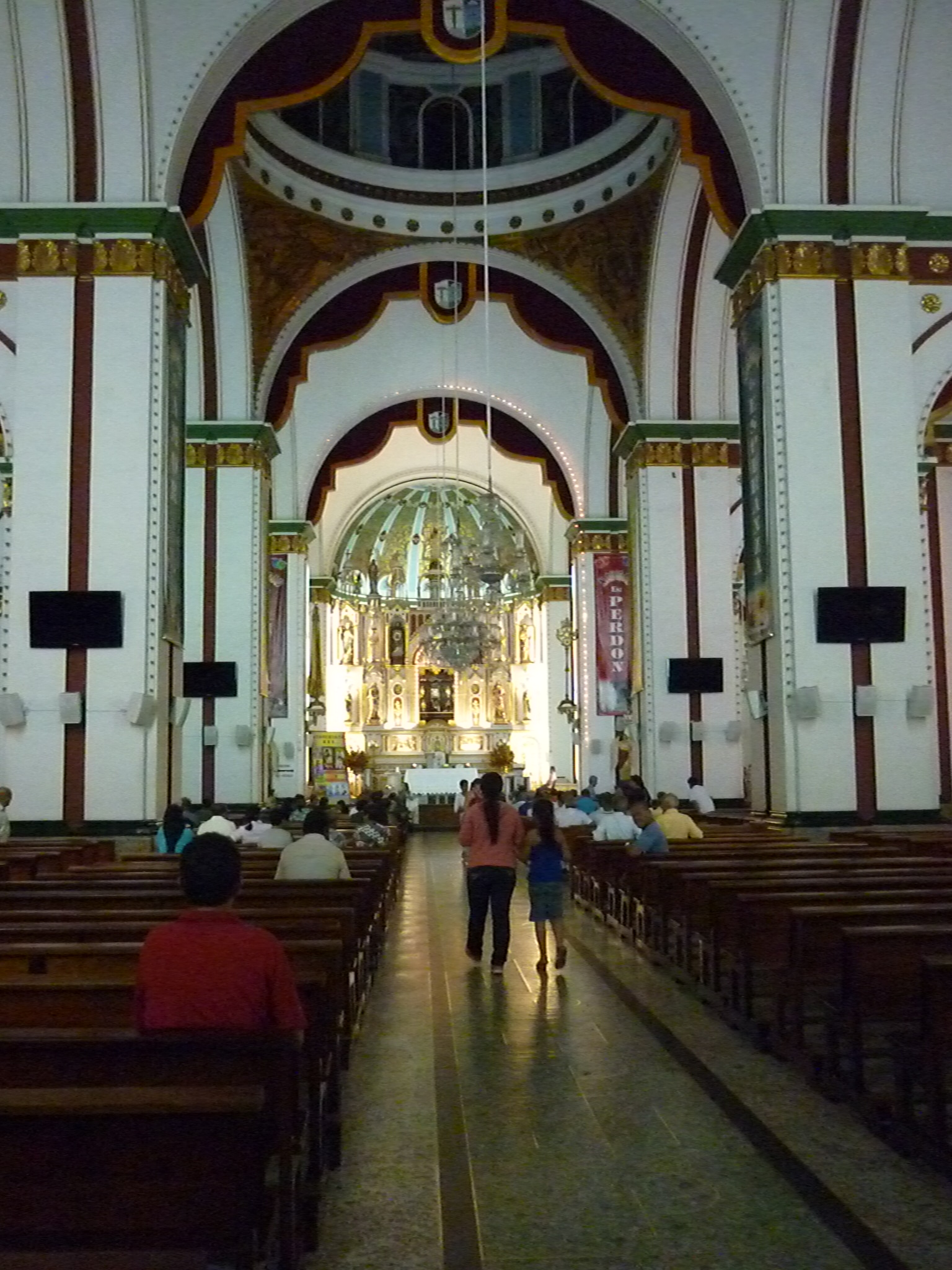

== Religious significance ==
The image of the Lord of Miracles of Buga has been used in religious processions and public acts of prayer for the Peace of Colombia, particularly during the grave narco-terrorist wave of violence that shocked Colombia during the second half of the 1980s and the first half of the 1990s. It has also been used in times of natural disasters, such as earthquakes in the Andes, or during strong floods caused by yearly tropical storms.[4] The Lord of the Miracles of Buga was sent on tour around to the principal cities of the country in 1993, including to the Capital Santa Fe de Bogota, as a special act of special consecration of the nation by the Roman Catholic Church that included several collective acts in which hundreds of thousands of believers were gathered to pray for the end to internal conflict.

Our Lord of Miracles had been turned to by the Catholic Church as a powerful national icon invoking peace and reconciliation on multiple occasions in Colombian history, especially when calling for an end to internal national strife. An interesting parallel between the natural predisposition of the Christ of Buga to be hung out in public procession, due to its change of size and weight, and the climate of religiosity in the country. By the end of June 1902, Colombia was consecrated to the Sacred Heart of Jesus as a nation for the first time by Monsignor Bernardo Herrera-Restrepo in El Voto Nacional, which is the church, specially built for the event, in the presence of President Jose María Sanclemente a few months before the ending of The Thousand Days' War.

In 1903, once the war was ended, the Lord of Miracles of Buga was taken outside of the basilica for the first time in years. The solemn act of consecration remained unaltered and was continuously practiced every year, with the presence of every single president of the country up until 1994, when it was derogated by the administration of Ernesto Samper-Pizano who was accused of having financed his political campaign with money from drugs lords. In the years following, outdoor processions in Buga were interrupted. This lasted until 2004 when Cardinals of the Roman Catholic Church restored the solemn act of the consecration of Colombia to the Sacred Heart of Jesus. Our Lord of Miracles of Buga was successfully exposed in solemn procession in 2007, as well as in 2014.

== Cultural significance ==
=== Symbol of Colombia ===
The cornerstone for the construction of the sanctuary was blessed by Ortiz, the Archbishop of Popayán. Also attending the religious ceremony was the president of the United States of Colombia, Rafael Núñez in 1886. The building of the church took more than 15 years, and was interrupted by the Thousand Days' War from 1900 and 1903, which is the worst civil war that ever occurred in Colombia.

The inauguration on 2 August 1907 was dedicated by the authorities of the department regional government and representatives of the national government as well as ecclesiastical authorities. The consecration of the basilica was carried out by the then Archbishop of Popayán, Msgr. Antonio Arboleda, on the Feast of St. Alphonsus Liguori, founder of the Redemptorist Order.

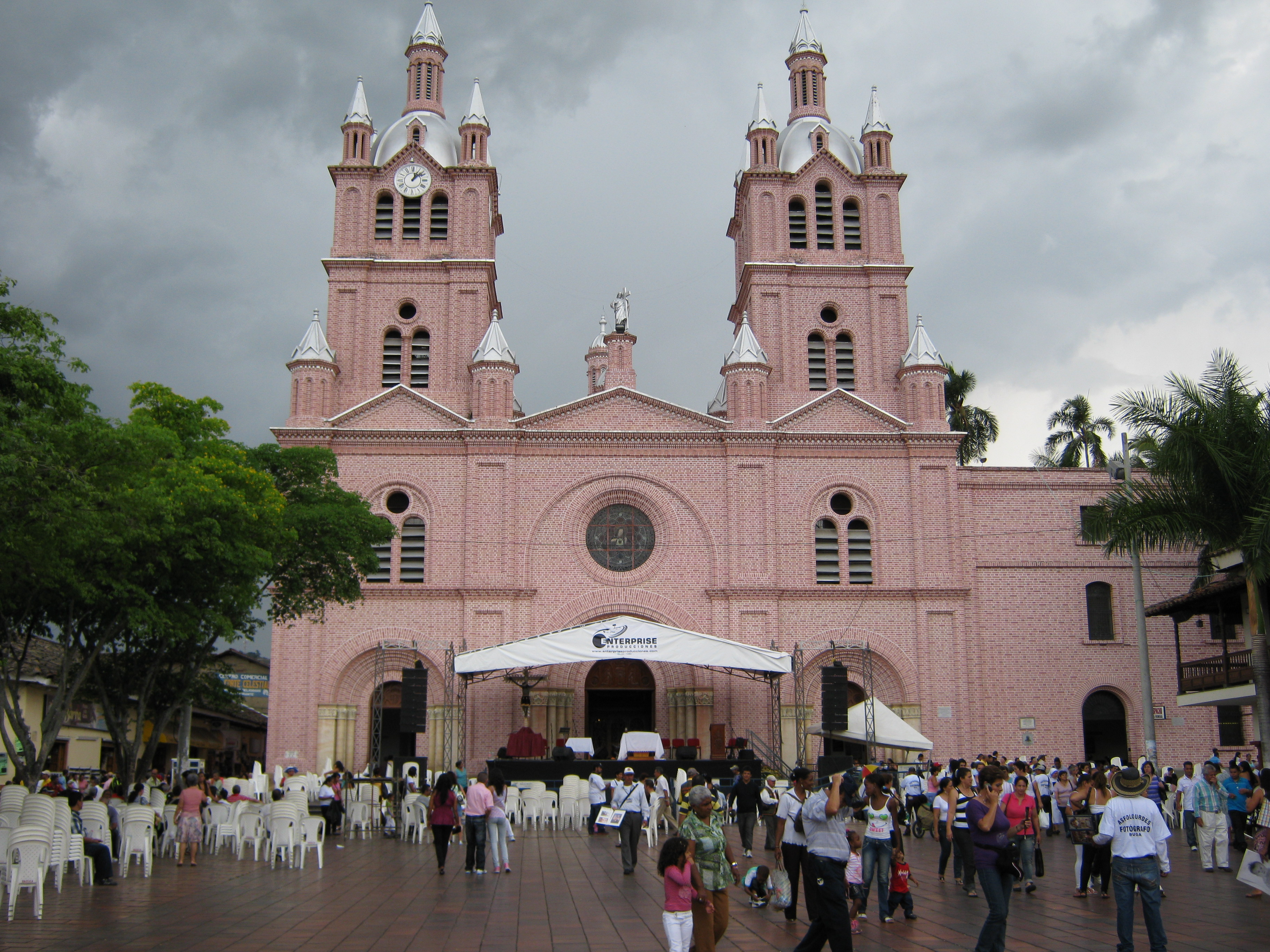

The basilica is 33 metres tall and 80 metres long, and had a French clock installed on 18 March 1909. In between its two towers is a cast iron statue of Christ the Redeemer standing 2.5 m. The five bells are imported from France and are the biggest church bells in Colombia. The bell called the "Miracle Maker" weighs 1.111 kg; the bell called Perpetuo Socorro emits a note of fa in Bm, weighing 778 kg, the bell called Saint Thérèse of the Child Jesus Child sounds a note of Sol, and weighs 548 kg. The smallest bell weighs 289 kg, and the biggest one (built in 1955), with three (3) tonnes.

The basilica covers a total area of about 2,088 sq meters. The Colombian film industry has found inspiration in the apparitions for some interesting productions, such as Strategy of the Snail, a 1993 film by Jorge Cabrera, in which Misia Triana (played by actress Delfina Guido) accidentally finds the silhouette of Virgin Mary on the wall of a house in dispute.

=== Colombian Culture ===
From an anthropological point of view, the image represents an interesting mixture of Christianity, introduced to South America by the Spaniards, and the cosmology characteristic of the Andean Cultures, whereby God communicates with the humans through rivers. For thousands of years streams or lakes were magical and mystical places of contact with the supernatural. The aborigines used great bodies of water as channels of communication with the great beyond, the world of the ancestors, and to pray to their divinities.

In Andean Colombia there is a legend about the Golden Man, El Dorado, an Aborigine Chibcha King who every year navigated the volcanic Guatavita lake, located over three thousand meters above sea level on a raft, accompanied by his priests; the King was carrying incredible offerings of gold to the gods to be thrown in the water. The Chibchas believed that their entire civilization came from a woman and a baby that suddenly emerged from the waters of another Andean lake in its territory.

Buga is currently located in the middle of the Cauca's valley, a region that was populated in ancient times, since at least 1000 years before Christ, by some of the most advanced prehispanic Colombian civilizations: Kalima, Quimbaya, Malagana, Katios, all among the best goldsmiths of the Americas. It was Sebastian de Benalcazar, a Lieutenant of Francisco Pizarro, who, in 1555, already confirmed as governor of Cauca Province, founded Guadalajara of Buga.

== Catholic Church ==
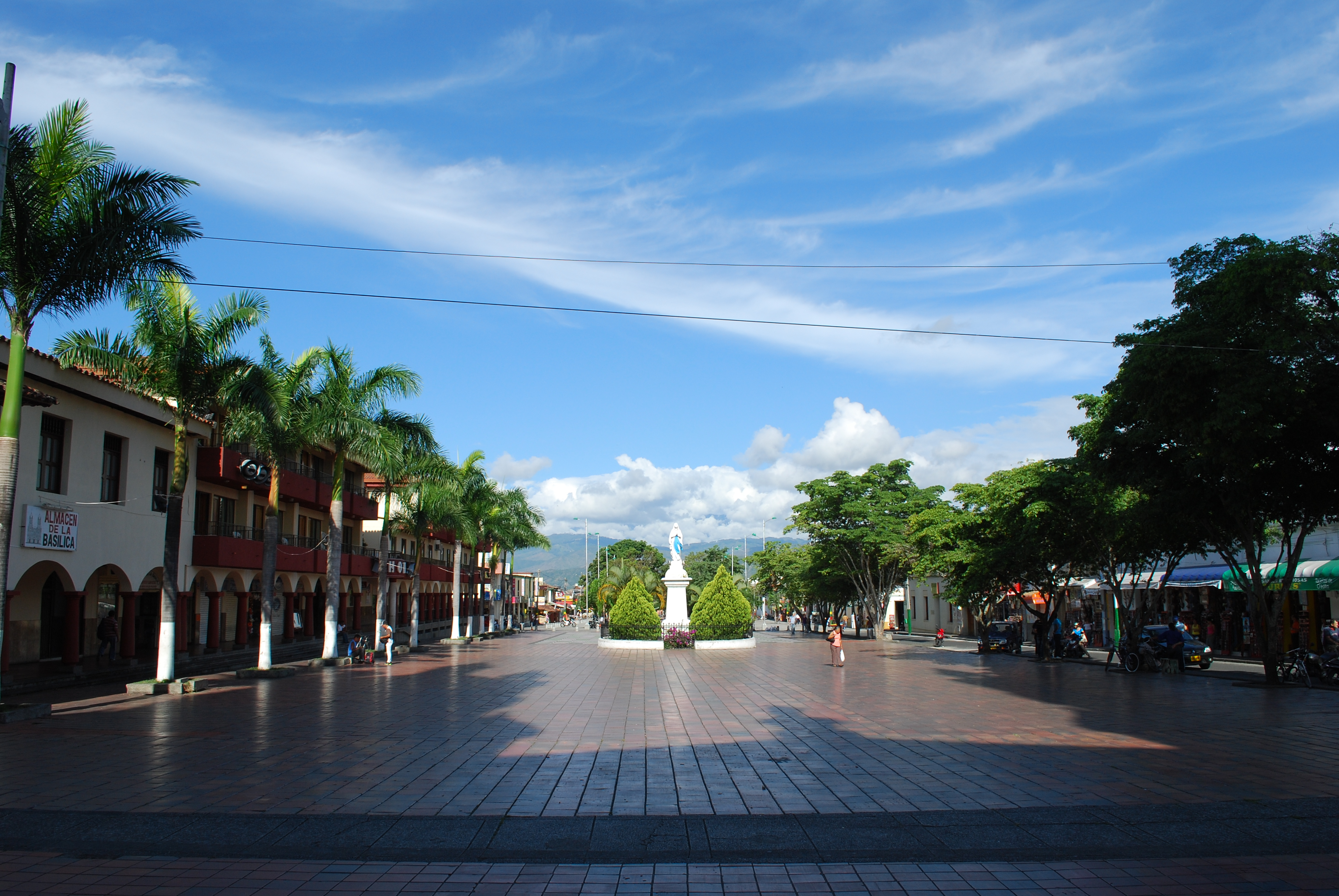
Basilica of Guadalajara of Buga Vista

=== Beliefs and miracles ===
Roman Catholic sources claim many miraculous and supernatural properties for the image such as the fact that the figure has maintained its structural integrity over nearly 500 years, while wooden replicas normally last only some few decades before they start to suffer degradation.

1. The washer woman found a tiny crucifix that was the size of her hand in the Guadalajara river and then it grew up to the size of a boy of 10 years old in a night. That was the first miracle.
2. In 1605, the Christ figure was burnt in a fire for two days. After the fire had gone out, the crucifix began to secrete oils.
3. The sudden move of the stream from its original riverbed to facilitate the peregrination of devotees coming from the city of Buga.
4. Marino A. Molina, a professional basketball sportsman who represented Colombia in the 1st Bolivian games of 1938, was healed being 6 years old of an infection of Gangrene in his mouth that was diagnosed as fatal and fret part of his left cheek and jaw. His mother prayed the Novena of our Lord of Miracles of Buga.
5. Tulia M. Aldana, who became the first national bank executive woman of Colombia in 1949 (Almagran), was healed by 1930 of a tumor in her right groin that was diagnosed as malignant by physicians who had recommended surgery, without any treatment after prayers of her grand mother to Our Lord of Miracles of Buga.
6. A worker in a mine in Peru who had had an accident and lost the power of speech and sight, was healed after he prayed to Our Lord of Miracles of Buga.
7. Romelio Cosio recovered the full motion on his legs after having been diagnosed with irreversible paraplegia. The miracle occurred when he was in prayer in front of the Crucifix. He literally left his crutches and start to walk normally without them.
8. Teresa Moreno had a nervous chronic spasm or tic that prevented her from talking or eating normally. After she prayed to the Christ figure, she was healed.
9. A boy of the Amazonian region of Caqueta was born with a severe infection in his lungs. Doctors predicted that he would soon die. Yet he survived, having been healed after prayers to Our Lord of Miracles of Buga.
10. In 2005, a youngster from Cundinamarca, Andean Colombia, suffered an accident that left her in a coma. After some months of prayer by her family using Our Lord of Miracles novena, she recovered consciousness.
11. Having as witness a priest, Fr. Guillermo Giraldo, a man who had been diagnosed as brain dead by physicians returned literally to life. His wife prayed to this Christ.
12. After three years praying the Novena to Our Lord of the Miracles of Buga, Marina Benítez became a mother. She had previously been diagnosed as sterile by physicians.
13. José Luna is a devotee who traveled from Mexico to Buga to give thanks to Our Lord of Miracles of Buga for the healing of his spine, after being bedridden for 4 years.

=== Clerical approbation ===
Several pontiffs have granted recognitions to the venerated image, namely the following:

- Pope Pius VI: In 1783, Pope Pius VI in response to a report of miracles occurred in the Sanctuary of Buga, with 22 “breves perpetuos”, gave special instructions granting generous indulgences to all the pilgrims that visit the sanctuary. The copy of this pontifical document is filed in the archives of the basilica.
- Pope Pius VIII: In 1819, the Roman Catholic Church officially approved the Novena of the Lord of Miracles of Buga, designed by the Franciscan friar Francisco G. Rodríguez, as a devotion offered by all that suffer disparate situations or try to defend impossible causes, in particular to overcome incurable diseases.
- Pope Pius XI: On 23 June 1937, Pope Píus XI granted to the sanctuary the title of minor Basilica. This decree was applied by Cardinal Eugenio Maria Giuseppe Giovanni Pacelli (later Pope Píus XII).
- Cardinal Primado of Colombia, Pedro Rubiano: On 2 August 2007 he presided the solemn Mass of celebration of the first 100 years of the Basilica of Our Lord of Miracles of Buga.

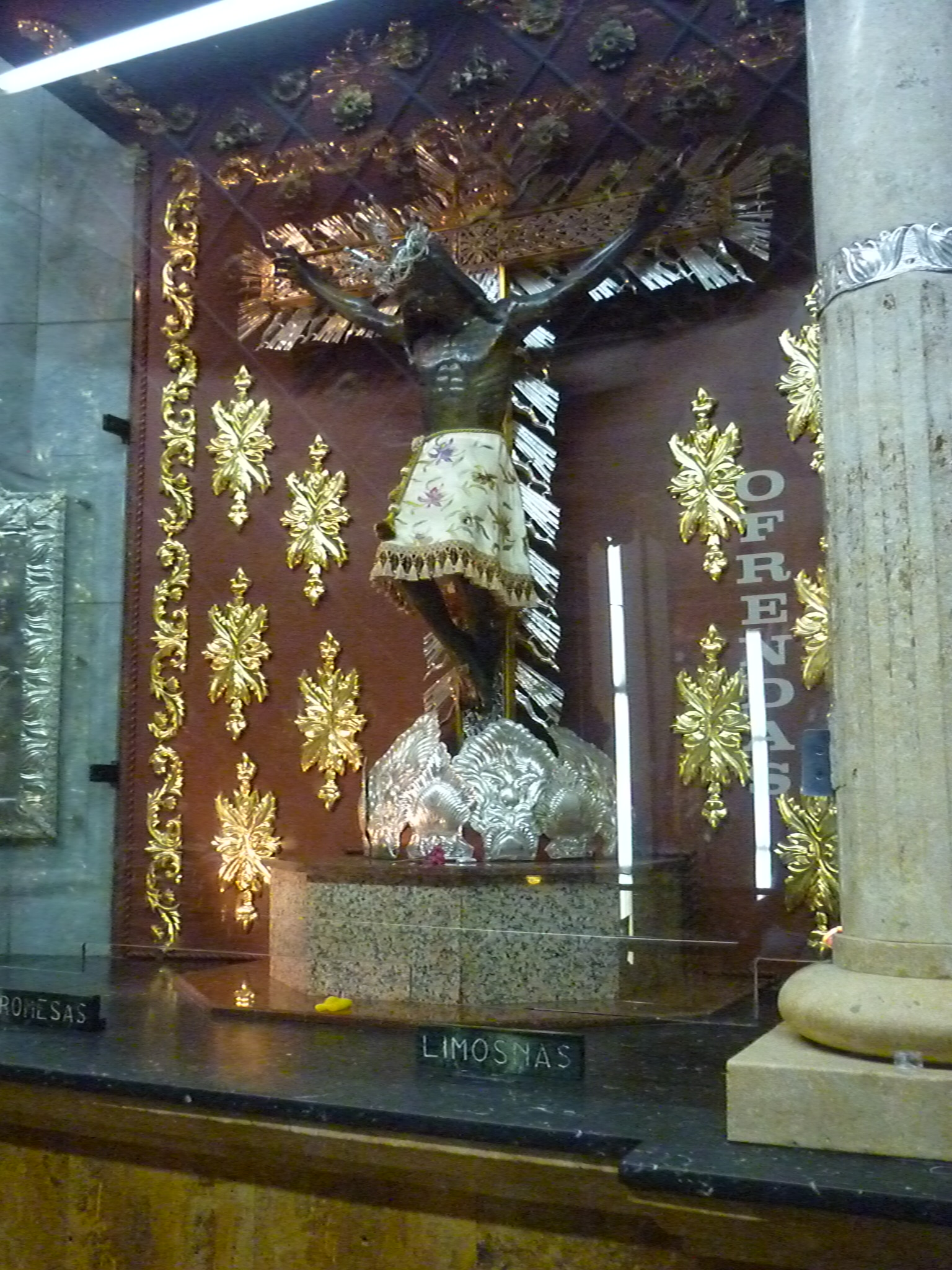

=== Devotions and veneration ===
The primary month of worship is September.

The annual festivities in honor of the Lord of Miracles of Buga (Colombia) in 2014 consisted of three special events that the Redemptorist friars, who have administrated the basilica along all its existence, and the Pilgrims had celebrated:

- First, the 130 years since the arrival of the Redemptorist Community to the city of Guadalajara de Buga
- Second, the 75 years since it was received the title of minor basilica, granted to the shrine by the Holy See
- Third, 25 years of service to the pilgrims and the social works of the “Pilgrim House Foundation”

These three reasons made the days of the Novena and the Feast Day (September 5–14) and the pilgrimage of thousands and thousands of pilgrims to the shrine/sanctuary a sight rarely seen before.

== See also ==
- Our Lady of the Mountain

== Notes ==
- 1.↑ a b «Basilicas in Colombia» (en inglés). Giga-Catholic Information. Consultado el 21 de noviembre de 2008
- 2.↑ «Sector Histórico». Alcaldía Municipal de Guadalajara de Buga. Consultado el 21 de noviembre de 2008
- 3.↑ «Historia de la Basílica de Buga». Milagroso de Buga. Consultado el 21 de noviembre de 2008
- 5.↑ «Creer y Consumir: La industria del turismo Religioso en Guadalajara de Buga. Juan Manuel Caycedo-Atehortua

Universidad Del Valle, Tesis Professional en Sociologia (October 2013)
