= Standard Gravure =

Printing company in Kentucky, US (1922–1992)

- Industry: Printing
- Founded: 1922
- Founder: Robert Worth Bingham
- Defunct: 1992
- Headquarters: Louisville, Kentucky

Standard Gravure was a Louisville, Kentucky rotogravure printing company founded in 1922 by Robert Worth Bingham and owned by the Bingham family. For decades, it printed the weekly The Courier-Journal as well as rotogravure sections for other newspapers as well as Parade.

By the 1980s, a shrinking print market had reduced revenues, and an employee wage freeze was instituted by then President William E. Bockmon in 1982.

In 1986, Bingham family patriarch Barry Bingham Sr. announced the family would sell all their media holdings including Standard Gravure. The employees of Standard Gravure made a bid to buy the company, but it was sold instead to Michael Shea from Atlanta, Georgia for $22 million. In the same year, the family sold The Louisville Courier-Journal and The Louisville Times for $305 million to the Gannett Company. After the sale the employees learned that $11 million of their employee pension fund had been used to help finance Shea's purchase. The company had 531 employees at two plants at the time of the sale.

On September 14, 1989, Standard Gravure came to national attention when Joseph T. Wesbecker, an employee on disability leave, entered the plant with several firearms and fired at employees for thirty minutes, injuring twelve and killing nine, including himself.

Standard Gravure closed in February 1992, after two serious fires. The building at 6th and Broadway and part of the Courier-Journal complex, was demolished and became a parking lot.
