= Standard Gravure shooting =

1989 mass shooting in Kentucky, US

- Location: 38.2481°N 85.7611°W; Louisville, Kentucky, U.S.
- Date: September 14, 1989; 37 years ago 8:38 – 9:00 a.m. (EDT; UTC−04:00)
- Attack type: Mass murder; mass shooting; murder-suicide
- Weapons: Polytech AK-47 semi-automatic rifle; 9mm SIG Sauer P226 semi-automatic pistol; Two MAC-11s; Smith & Wesson Model 12 Airweight snubnosed revolver; Bayonet
- Deaths: 9 (including the perpetrator)
- Injuries: 12
- Perpetrator: Joseph Thomas "Rocky" Wesbecker
- Litigation: Lawsuit against Prozac manufacturer Eli Lilly and Company

The Standard Gravure shooting occurred on September 14, 1989, in Louisville, Kentucky, United States, when Joseph Thomas Wesbecker, a 47-year-old pressman, killed eight people and injured twelve at his former workplace, Standard Gravure, before committing suicide. The shooting is the deadliest incident of workplace violence in Kentucky's history as well as the deadliest mass shooting. The murders resulted in a high-profile lawsuit against Eli Lilly and Company, manufacturers of the antidepressant drug Prozac, which Wesbecker had begun taking during the month prior to his shooting rampage.

== Background ==
Standard Gravure was a prominent printing company founded in 1922 by Robert Worth Bingham. Reduced revenues led to an employee wage freeze in 1982, and in 1986 the Bingham family sold the company. Standard Gravure's customers were retailers, many of which were in the process of going out of business, and at the same time, paper shortages were occurring in the marketplace.

== Shooting ==
On September 14, 1989, Wesbecker, who was nicknamed "Rocky" by his colleagues, parked his car in front of the main entrance of Standard Gravure and entered the plant at 8:38 a.m., carrying a Polytech AK-47S, (a Chinese-made semiautomatic AK-47 derivative), a SIG Sauer P226 9mm pistol, and a duffel bag containing two MAC-11s, a snubnosed .38 caliber Smith & Wesson Model 12 Airweight revolver, a bayonet, and several hundred rounds of ammunition.

He took the elevator to the executive reception area on the third floor and, as soon as the doors opened, he fired at receptionists Sharon Needy, whom he killed, and Angela Bowman, who he paralyzed with a shot in the back. Searching for Standard Gravure's President, Michael Shea, and other supervisors and managers of the plant, Wesbecker calmly walked through the hallways, deliberately shooting at people. He killed James Husband and injured Forrest Conrad, Paula Warman and John Stein, a bindery supervisor whom he shot in the head and abdomen. Wesbecker then headed down the stairs to the pressroom, where he killed Paul Sallee and wounded Stanley Hatfield and David Sadenfaden, two electricians from Marine Electric who were working on a broken machine.

Leaving his duffel bag under a stairwell, Wesbecker walked down to the basement, where he encountered pressman John Tingle who, alerted by the loud noises, went to see what was going on. Tingle greeted his colleague, asking him what was happening. Wesbecker replied: "Hi John... I told them I'd be back. Get away from me." After Tingle moved out of his way, Wesbecker continued his path through the basement, shooting Richard Barger in the back, killing him. According to witnesses, Wesbecker approached Barger's body and apologized, having apparently killed him accidentally, as he could not see at whom he was shooting.

Back on the pressroom floor, he shot at anyone in his way, killing James Wible and Lloyd White, then entered the breakroom, where he emptied his magazine, hitting all seven workers present and killing William Ganote with a shot to the head. Wesbecker then reloaded and resumed firing, fatally wounding Kenneth Fentress.

Wesbecker then returned to the pressroom, where he pulled out his SIG Sauer, put it under his chin, and shot himself, ending a shooting spree that had lasted for about half an hour. He had fired about 40 rounds.

== Victims ==
Initially, seven people were killed in the attack and thirteen were wounded, but Kenneth Fentress, who was shot four times, died from his injuries on September 18. One person who was not struck by gunfire had suffered a heart attack.

- Richard Owen Barger, 54
- Kenneth Lee Fentress, 45
- William Spencer Ganote Sr., 46
- James Gary Husband Sr., 47
- Sharon Lee Needy, 49
- Paul Stevenson Sallee, 60
- Lloyd Ray White, 42
- James Franklin Wible Sr., 56

== Investigation ==
When police searched Wesbecker's house, they recovered a shotgun, a Colt 9-millimeter revolver, a .32 revolver, and a starter's pistol. They found Wesbecker's will, as well as an issue of Time Magazine, on the kitchen table. The magazine featured an article about Patrick Purdy, the perpetrator of the Cleveland Elementary School shooting earlier that year.

== Perpetrator ==
Photo of Joseph Wesbecker from his driver's licence.

Joseph Thomas "Rocky" Wesbecker (April 27, 1942 – September 14, 1989) was identified as the perpetrator. When he was 13 months old, his father, a construction worker, died in a fall. After his father's death, he was raised as an only child by his mother Martha, herself only 16 years old at that time, and her family, though he was often passed from place to place during his early childhood, and at one time deposited in an orphanage for almost a year. His grandfather, to whom he felt closely attached, died when he was four.

As Wesbecker was a poor student, he dropped out of high school in the ninth grade, but later managed to earn his G.E.D. In 1960 he started to work as a pressman at a printing plant and married one year later. With his wife he had two sons, James and Joseph. In 1971, he started working at Standard Gravure, where he soon earned a reputation as a determined, hard-working, loyal and reliable worker.

The year 1978 marked the beginning of the downward slope of Wesbecker's life. His marriage ended in divorce and a bitter battle over custody and support for his two sons ensued. It was also the year he admitted himself for the first time to a hospital to seek psychiatric treatment. In 1983, Wesbecker married again; Wesbecker's second marriage also ended in divorce after one year. As a consequence he became increasingly reclusive and suicidal, separated from most of his family members and lived an overall lonely life, in whose center his work remained.

After the selling of Standard Gravure and the subsequent management change in 1986, Wesbecker was assigned to a mechanical folder. He soon complained about stress and undue pressure and asked to be placed back at his old job. His request was declined, and he grew increasingly hostile against the new management, became wary of conspiracies aimed to harass him, and began to complain about policy changes at the company. He started complaining that exposure to toluene at work caused him memory loss, dizziness and "blackout spells".

The hostility culminated in May 1987, when Wesbecker filed a complaint with the Jefferson County Human Relations Commission, charging that he was being harassed and discriminated against for his psychological state and being deliberately put under stressful conditions. A subsequent examination confirmed that Wesbecker suffered from depression and bipolar, substantiating his claim of mental illness. He was prescribed Prozac.

In August 1988, Wesbecker stopped working and was finally put on a long-term disability leave in February 1989, though there was also an agreement to re-employ him as soon as he recovered sufficiently. Between August 1988 and May 1989, Wesbecker bought several weapons, among them the AK-47 and pistol he later used in the shooting. Shortly before the shooting at Standard Gravure, where he showed up the last time on September 13, Wesbecker presumably received a letter from the company, announcing the cancellation of his disability income.

=== Psychiatric history ===
Wesbecker had a long history of psychiatric illness and was treated for it in hospitals at least three times between 1978 and 1987. He was diagnosed as suffering from alternating episodes of deep depression and manic depression, was beset, among others, by confusion, anger and anxiety and made several attempts to commit suicide. Hospital records also suggested that Wesbecker posed a threat to himself and others.

According to CBS's 60 Minutes, "In 1984, five years before he took Prozac, Wesbecker's medical records show that he had this conversation with a doctor. Have you ever felt like harming someone else? 'Yes,' Wesbecker said. Who? 'My foreman.' When? 'At work.' The same medical records show Wesbecker had already attempted suicide 12 to 15 times."

In the years prior to the shooting, Wesbecker more than once threatened to "kill a bunch of people" or to bomb Standard Gravure and at one point considered hiring an assassin to kill several executives of the company. Apparently, he even discussed these things with his wife before their divorce. When he left Standard Gravure in August 1988, he told other workers that he would come back to wipe out the place and get even with the company. Shortly before the shooting, he told one of his aunts that he was upset about things at work, and said they will get paid back, but as he said these things all the time, she didn't take the threat too seriously.

One of the employees at Standard Gravure said after the shooting: "This guy's been talking about this for a year. He's been talking about guns and Soldier of Fortune magazine. He's paranoid, and he thought everyone was after him." Three days prior to the shooting, on September 11, Wesbecker told his psychiatrist that a foreman had forced Wesbecker to perform oral sex on him in front of his co-workers to get off the folder. In his notes, the psychiatrist wrote "Prozac?"

== Lawsuit ==
In August 1989, less than a month before the shooting, Wesbecker had started taking Prozac. The wounded and the families of those killed filed a lawsuit against the drug's manufacturer, Eli Lilly and Company, claiming that Wesbecker's use of Prozac contributed to his actions. The case went to jury trial.

One of Eli Lilly's defences was that the Food and Drug Administration (FDA) had approved Prozac, to which the plaintiffs countered that Eli Lilly had failed to give the FDA accurate information about testing of the drug, including tests by the Federal Health Agency (BGA) in the Federal Republic of Germany. Initially, trial judge excluded as irrelevant and unduly prejudicial evidence that Eli Lilly had in 1985 been found guilty of failing to report to the FDA adverse effects of Oraflex during testing, including deaths. The FDA only became aware of Oraflex's adverse effects when, in August 1982, the British Committee on the Safety of Medicines telegrammed the FDA that it had received 3,500 reports of adverse side effects, including 61 deaths. Eli Lilly and its chief medical officer pled guilty to multiple criminal violations of various federal statutes and withholding evidence adverse to the drug, including 11 deaths in the US, from the FDA.

Upon an application by the plaintiffs, the trial judge admitted the Oraflex evidence on the ground that Eli Lilly itself had adduced evidence that it had a reputation for reporting adverse incidents to the FDA, putting the matter in issue. The evidence was never led. The plaintiffs agreed not to do so in a secret agreement with Eli Lilly that was concealed from the trial judge, John W. Potter, in order that the trial could continue. The jury ruled in favor of Eli Lilly without having heard the Oraflex evidence. Information about parties' agreement later emerged with the case proceeding to verdict without plaintiffs' strongest evidence in order to obtain a favorable verdict, thereby setting a misleading precedent deterring similar lawsuits in the future related to Prozac. How much was paid to the plaintiffs and other details of the settlement are unknown.

When plaintiffs failed to appeal and noting that plaintiffs’ attorneys deliberately had withheld their strongest evidence (the Oraflex evidence) which he had ruled should be admitted Judge Potter suspected something was amiss, and accused Lilly of questionable ethics and trial fixing. With unanimous authorization from the Kentucky Supreme Court, Judge Potter successfully applied to have the court record show that the suit was indeed resolved by settled rather by jury verdict absolving Eli Lilly.

Eli Lilly since has paid out an estimated $50m across 300 lawsuits arising from homicides, suicides and suicide attempts connected with Prozac use.

== See also ==
- 2023 Louisville bank shooting
