= Torralba =

Torralba can refer to:

== Places ==
=== Italy ===
- Torralba, Sardinia, a comune in the Province of Sassari

=== Spain ===
- Solana de Torralba, a town in the municipality of Úbeda in the province of Jaén
- Torralba (Cuenca), a town in the province of Cuenca, Castile-La Mancha
- Torralba and Ambrona (archaeological site), an archaeological site in Soria, Castile and León
- Torralba de Aragón, a town in the province of Huesca, Aragon
- Torralba del Burgo, a village in the municipality of Burgo de Osma in the province of Soria
- Torralba de Arciel, a town in the municipality of Gómara, Soria
- Torralba de Calatrava, a town in Ciudad Real, Castile-La Mancha
- Torralba de los Frailes, a town in the province of Zaragoza, Aragon
- Torralba de los Sisones, a town in the province of Teruel, Aragon
- Torralba de Oropesa, a town in the province of Toledo, Castile-La Mancha
- Torralba de Ribota, a town in the province of Zaragoza, Aragon
- Torralba del Moral, a town in the municipality of Medinaceli in the province of Soria
- Torralba Del Río, a town in Navarre
- Torralba del Pinar, a town in the comarca of Alto Mijares, Castellón, Valencia
- Vados de Torralba, a town in the municipality of Villatorres in the province of Jaén

== See also ==
- Torralba (surname)
