= Duáñez =

Locality in Soria, Spain

Coordinates: 41°44′N 2°20′W

Duáñez is a locality and also a minor local entity in the province of Soria, in the judicial district of Soria, in the autonomous community of Castile and León, Spain. It is a village in the Comarca of Campo de Gómara that belongs to the municipality of Candilichera.

== Geography ==
This small town in the region of Campo de Gómara is located in the centre of the province of Soria, east of the capital and separated by the Sierra de Santa Ana.

== Communications ==
Locality located on the N-234 national road from Soria to Calatayud, between Martialay and Ojuel. Road leading north to Fuentetecha.

== History ==
The 1528 Census of Pecheros, in which ecclesiastics, noblemen and nobles were not counted, recorded the existence of 10 pecheros, i.e. tax-paying family units. In the original document it appears as Dohañe and was part of the Sexmo of Arciel.

At the fall of the Ancien Régime, the locality became a constitutional municipality in the region of Castilla la Vieja, in the district of Soria, which in the 1842 census had 7 households and 28 inhabitants, and later7 became part of Candilichera.
