= Gomara =

Gomara may refer to:

- Gomara, a Cimmerian city
- Gomara, a clan of the Bharwad community found in India
- Gómara, Soria, a municipality of Soria province, Spain
- Francisco López de Gómara, 16th-century Spanish historian and chronicler of the expedition of Hernán Cortés
- Gomara Adans., a defunct genus of plants, now Crassula
