= Canons Regular of the Holy Sepulchre =

Catholic religious order

- Ordo Canonicorum Regularium Custodum Sacrosant Sepulchri Domini Hierosolymitani
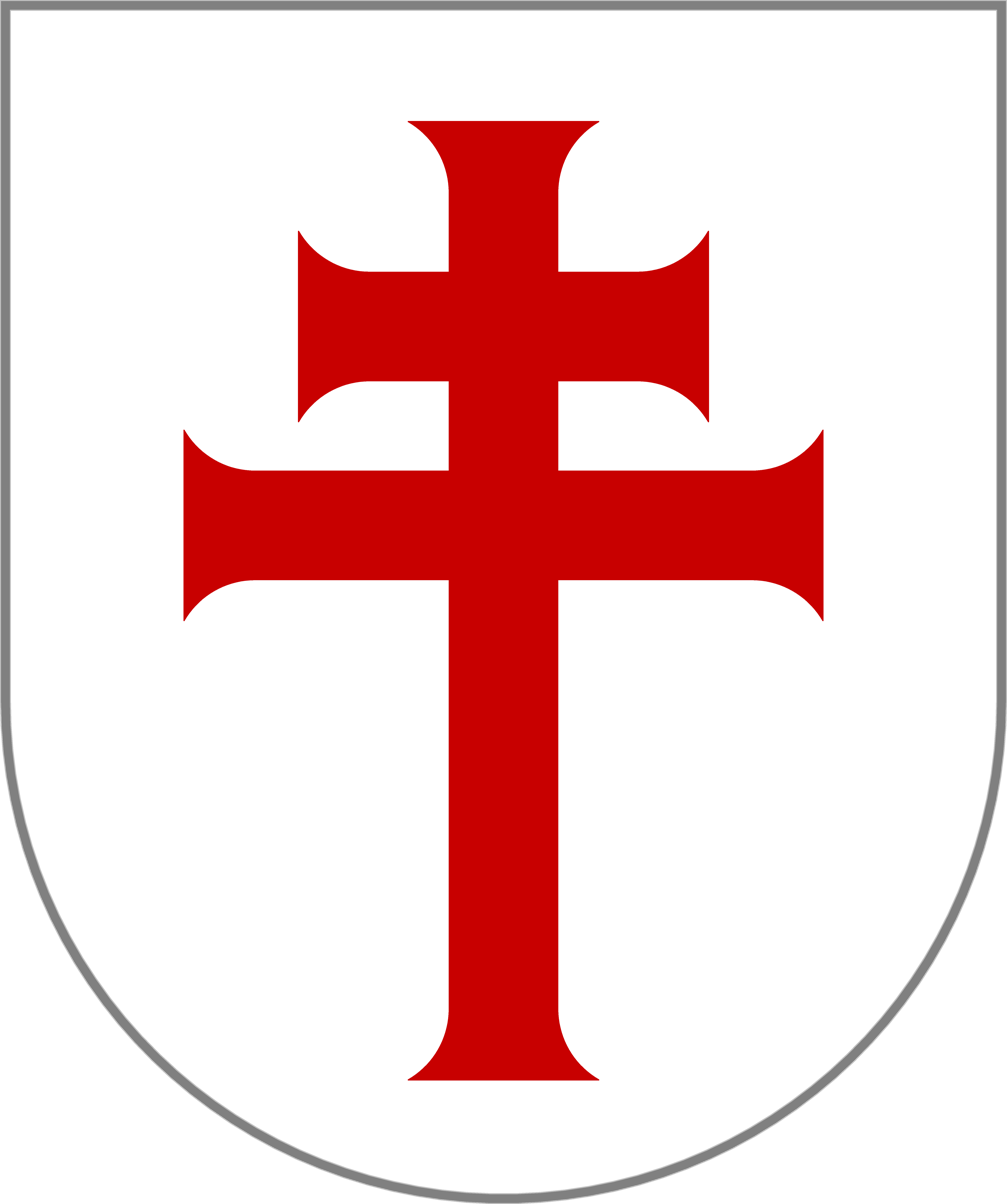
- Coat of arms of the Canons Regular of the Holy Sepulchre
- Formation: 1113 (1099)
- Founded at: Church of the Holy Sepulchre; Jerusalem, Kingdom of Jerusalem
- Dissolved: 1830; 196 years ago
- Type: Canons Regular
- Purpose: Protection of the Church of the Holy Sepulchre
- Location: Jerusalem, Kingdom of Jerusalem
- Methods: Rule of Saint Augustine
- Parent organization: Catholic Church
- Secessions: Canonesses of the Holy Sepulchre (c. 1300)

The Canons Regular of the Holy Sepulchre were a Catholic religious order of canons regular of the Rule of Saint Augustine, said to have been founded in the Church of the Holy Sepulchre in Jerusalem, then the capital of the Kingdom of Jerusalem, and recognised in 1113 by a Papal bull of Pope Paschal II. Other accounts have it that they were founded earlier, during the rule of Godfrey of Bouillon (1099–1100).

After the fall of Jerusalem to Saladin, the Canons fled the Holy Land along with other Latin Christians. They first settled briefly on Cyprus, where they established Bellapais Abbey, before proceeding to settle in various countries of Europe.

The Canons Regular of the Holy Sepulchre was suppressed in 1489 by Pope Innocent VIII (1484–1492). On March 28, 1489, the pope, at the instigation of the Order of Malta, issued a bull by which the Order of Canons Regular of the Holy Sepulchre was to be dissolved and transferred to the Order of Malta. However, the independence of the Order of Canons Regular of the Holy Sepulchre was maintained at the request of Emperor Maximilian and Duke Eberhard of Württemberg and confirmed in 1499 with a bull of Pope Alexander VI (1492–1503).

Because of this, the male branch of the Order of Canons Regular of the Holy Sepulchre existed in Europe until the 19th century, with many branches in Spain, Germany, and Poland. Tomasz de Nowina Novinski, last General of the Order and Auxiliary Bishop of Kraków (1816–1830) died on 4 January 1830 in Miechów (Poland).

The Canonesses Regular of the Holy Sepulchre, founded in the 14th century as a female branch of the Canons Regular of the Holy Sepulchre, still exist in convents in Belgium, the Netherlands, France, Spain, and England.

== History ==
=== Foundation ===
It is the opinion of Helyot and others that no canons of the Holy Sepulchre existed before 1114, when some canons regular who had adopted the Rule of St. Augustine were brought from the West and introduced into Jerusalem by Godfrey of Bouillon. On the other hand, Suarez and others recognise the tradition of the order, which maintains that St James, the first Bishop of Jerusalem, established clerics living in common there, where also after the Crusades flourished the "Congregation of the Holy Sepulchre".

=== Kingdom of Jerusalem ===
Between c.1119 and c.1125, Prior Gerard of the Holy Sepulchre, along with Warmund, Patriarch of Jerusalem, wrote a letter to Diego Gelmírez, Archbishop of Santiago de Compostela, reporting crop failures and threats from their enemies. They requested food, money, and military aid in order to maintain the Kingdom of Jerusalem. William of Malines, Latin Patriarch of Jerusalem 1130–1145, may have preceded Gerard as prior of the order.

By a papal bull dated 10 January 1143 and found in the Bullarium Lateranense, Pope Celestine II confirmed the church and the Canons Regular of the Holy Sepulchre in all the possessions they had received from Godfrey of Bouillon, King Baldwin I, and other benefactors. Mention is also made in the bull of several churches in the Holy Land and in Italy belonging to the canons. Cardinal de Vitry, a canon regular of Oignies and cardinal patriarch of Jerusalem, relates that among other churches the canons served the Church of the Holy Sepulchre as well as those on Mounts Zion and Olivet. The patriarch was also abbot of the Holy Sepulchre, elected by the canons regular.

The organisation relied on donations, such as when Melisende, Queen of Jerusalem in 1160 gave her assent to a grant made by her son Amalric to the Holy Sepulchre, perhaps on the occasion of the birth of her granddaughter Sibylla to Agnes and Amalric. In the mid-12th century, the village of Bayt 'Itab was a fief of the Church of the Holy Sepulchre. It was sold to them by the wife of Johannes Gothman, a Frankish crusader knight who was captured by Muslim forces in 1161 and subsequently ransomed. A fortified mansion (maison forte) in the modern village is thought to have served as Gothman's residence prior to its sale to the Church. The building had two stories, both vaulted. The ground floor entrance was protected by a slit-machicolation and had stairs leading to the basement and upper floor. The only priory the order held outside of Jerusalem, however, was that on the Mount of the Temptation, bestowed to it by the patriarch William of Malines in 1130, probably initially in order to rein in autonomous hermits in the area. When it received the tithes from nearby Jericho two years later, however, it became the source of 5,000 bezants a year in income. The priory and pilgrim visitors to the Mount and nearby River Jordan were protected by the Templar fortress of Dok at the mountain's summit.

After the Third Crusade, Joscius, Archbishop of Tyre, became chancellor of Jerusalem for Henry II of Champagne, who had married Queen Isabella I of Jerusalem after Conrad's murder, but had not taken the title of King. Henry was involved in a dispute with the Canons of the Church of the Holy Sepulchre over the election of a new Latin Patriarch, and had them arrested until Joscius intervened. Joscius was also present at the foundation of the Teutonic Knights in 1198, and probably died in 1202.

=== Europe ===
In Europe, the Canons established themselves and had monasteries in Italy, France, Spain, Poland, England, Croatia and the Low Countries.

==== Cyprus ====
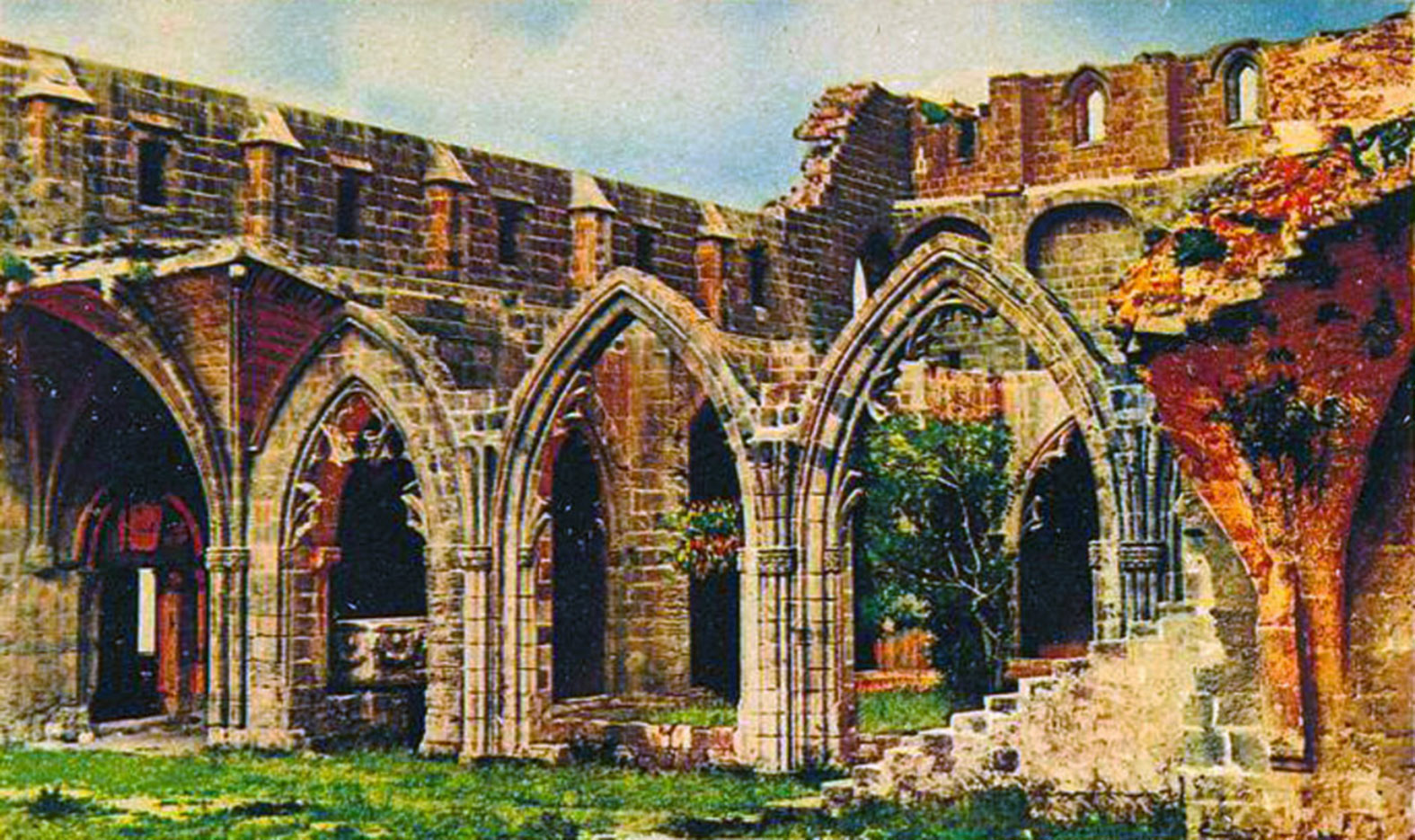
Ruins of the Bellapais Abbey in Cyprus (early 20th century).

After the fall of Jerusalem to Saladin, the canons fled the Holy Land along with other Latin Christians. They first settled briefly on Cyprus, where they established Bellapais Abbey, before proceeding to Western Europe

==== Spain ====
In Spain, the village of Torralba de Ribota belonged to the mother church at Calatayud of the Canons of the Holy Sepulchre, under the protection of Pedro Manrique de Lara, Dei gratia comes, "by the grace of God count". Also, possibly, the convent of Santa Anna in Barcelona, today a church, was originally a house of the Canons Regular of the Holy Sepulchre, or the Order of the Holy Sepulchre, under the guidance of the Patriarch of Jerusalem.

==== Poland ====
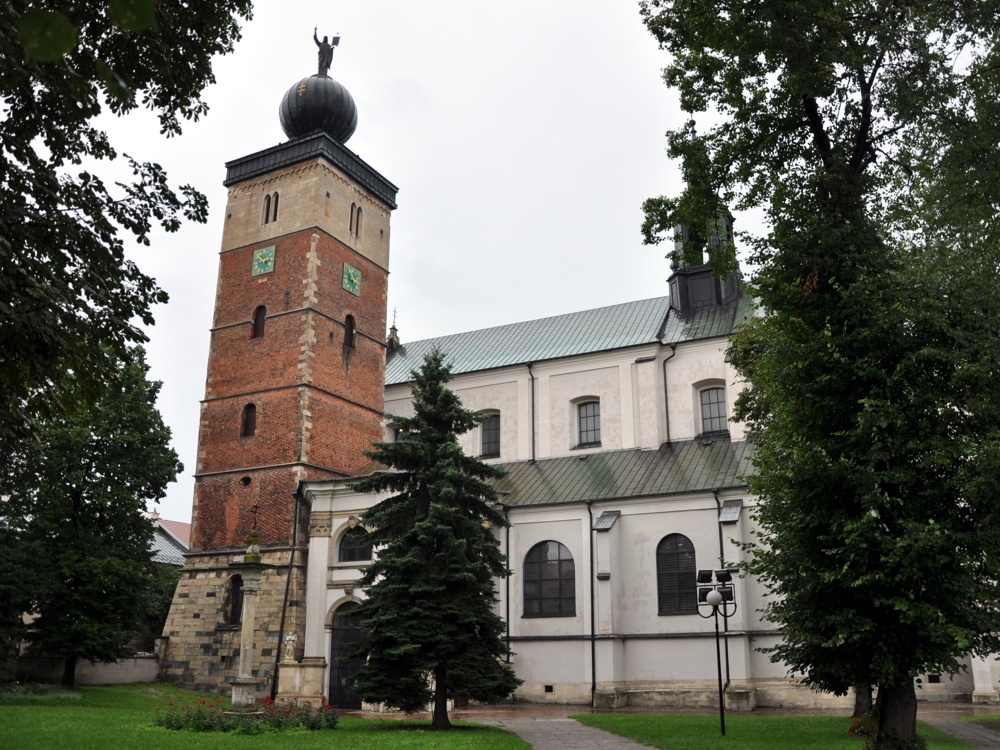
Church of the Holy Sepulchre, Miechów, Poland.

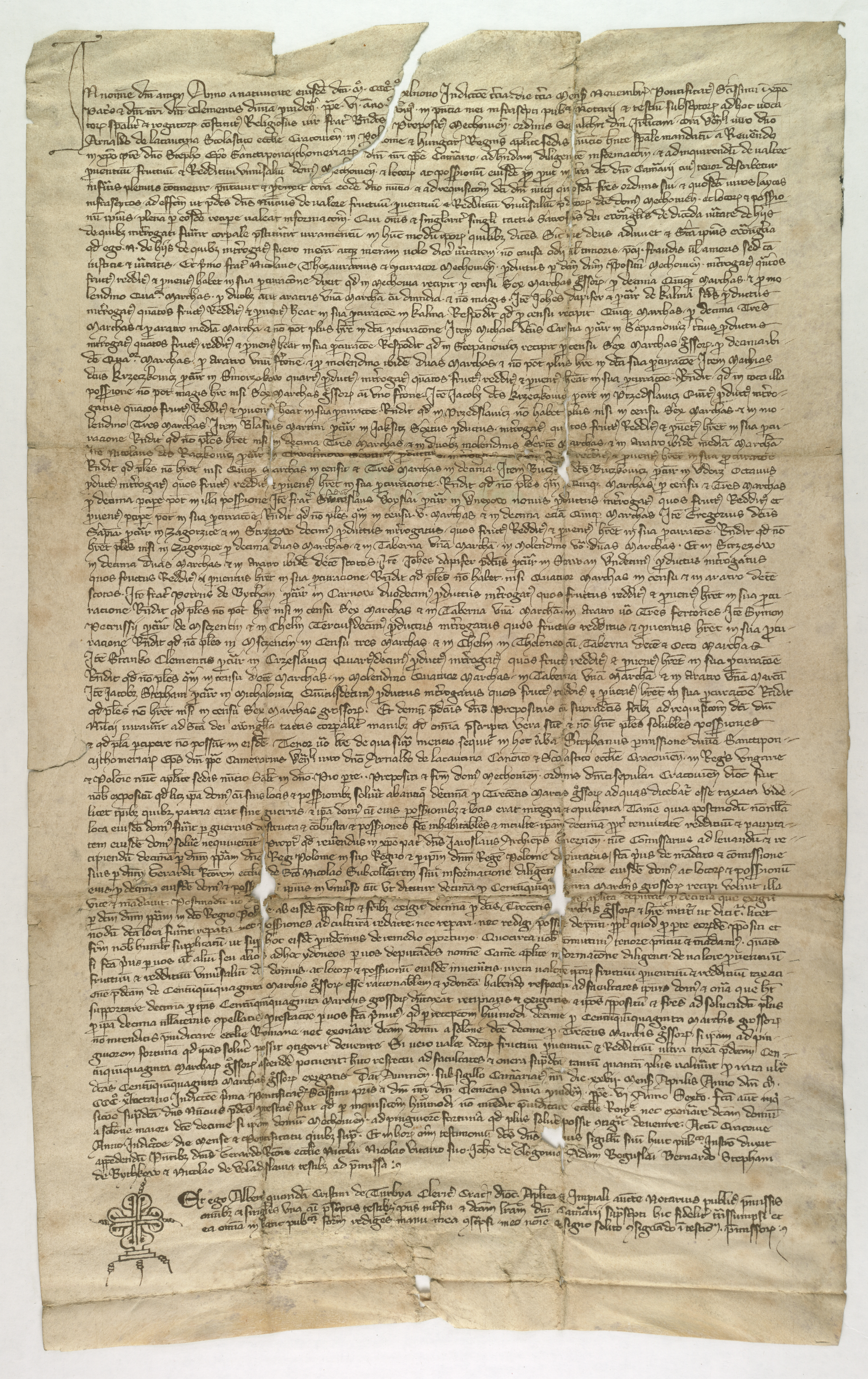
Witness statements of income of the monastery of the Church of the Holy Sepulchre, Miechów before the papal nuncio in 1349.

In Poland, they were notably active in the Church of the Holy Sepulchre, Miechów, which received many privileges from Casimir of Bytom, and Casimir II the Just after many Canons came to settle there after their expulsion from the Holy Land. After the ultimate fall of the Kingdom of Jerusalem to the Muslims in 1291, the Superior of the convent at Miechów took the title of General of the order, later claiming the style of Grand Prior, and Miechów became the headquarters of the organisation for centuries. Here, the order initiated the custom of setting up, decorating, and visiting Christ's graves on the last days of the Passion Week. It was in Miechów that the oldest replica of the Holy Sepulchre in Europe, the goal of numerous pilgrims, has been preserved. In Poland, they also receives privileges from Przemysł II.

==== England ====
In England, they were also active. According to William Dugdale's Monasticon Anglicanum, (1655) the Canons had two houses in England, one at Holy Sepulchre Priory, Thetford and the other at Warwick. Further indications propose Caldwell Priory and the Nottingham Holy Sepulchre Priory.

==== Croatia ====
King Andrew II of Hungary used the funds that he inherited from his father to recruit supporters among the Hungarian lords. He also formed an alliance with Leopold VI, Duke of Austria, and they plotted against Emeric. Their united troops routed the royal army at Mački, Slavonia, in December 1197. Under duress, King Emeric gave Croatia and Dalmatia to Andrew as an appanage. In practice, Andrew administered Croatia and Dalmatia as an independent monarch. He minted coins, granted land and confirmed privileges. He cooperated with the Frankopans, Babonići, and other local lords. The Canons Regular of the Holy Sepulchre settled in the province during his rule.

=== Decline ===
In Italy, they seem to have been suppressed in 1489 by Pope Innocent VIII, he wanted to transfer all their property to the Knights of Malta. The independence of the Canons Regular of the Holy Sepulchre was maintained at the request of Emperor Maximilian I and the Duke of Eberhard of Württemberg, and in 1499 with a bull of the Pope Alexander VI confirmed. In other countries than Italy, however, they appear to have continued. In France, they are assumed to have existed until about the time of the French Revolution in 1789, and in Poland after the monastery of Neisse was dissolved in the year 1810, the main monastery in Miechów was also dissolved in the year 1819. As regards men, the male congregation of Canons Regular is now regarded as extinct.

=== Canonesses Regular of the Holy Sepulchre ===
Notwithstanding, the Canonesses Regular of the Holy Sepulchre, founded in the 14th century as a female branch of the Canons Regular of the Holy Sepulchre, still exists in convents in Belgium, the Netherlands, France, Spain and England.
