= St. Mary of the Mountain =

St. Mary of the Mountain[s] and Our Lady of the Mountain[s] are among the many titles of Mary, mother of Jesus. Among dedications using the titles are:

- Abbey of St Maria del Monte (founded 1001), Benedictine monastery in Cesena, Italy
- Bellapais Abbey (founded c.1200), Cyprus
- Santa Maria del Monte de Cea, León, Spain
- St. Mary's of the Mountain Church (built 1839), Hunter, Greene County, New York, United States
- Our Lady of the Mountain, Colombia
- Our Lady of the Mount Catholic Church (Honolulu)
- Notre-Dame-des-Monts, Quebec, Canada
- Notre-Dame-de-Monts, Vendée, France

== See also ==
- Our Lady of Mount Carmel
