= Emanuel Tanay =

Polish-American forensic psychiatrist

- Born: March 5, 1928; Wilno, Poland
- Died: August 5, 2014 (aged 86)
- Occupation(s): physician, psychiatrist

Emanuel Tanay (March 5, 1928 – August 5, 2014) was a Polish-American physician, a forensic psychiatrist, and a Jewish Holocaust survivor.

== Early life ==
Tanay was born in Wilno, Poland on March 5, 1928, but the family soon moved to Miechów, a small community just north of Kraków. His mother, Betty Tenenwurzel, was both a physician and dentist and his father, Bunim Tenenwurzel, was a dentist. He survived by being hidden in the Catholic monastery of Mogila in Kraków, Poland.

In 1943 Tanay escaped from occupied Poland with his mother and sister to Slovakia and then Hungary. They were liberated in January 1945 in Budapest. He immigrated to the United States after World War II. He did his psychiatric residency at Elgin State Hospital in Elgin, Illinois.

== Career ==
Tanay was Clinical Professor of Psychiatry at the Wayne State University Medical School in Detroit, Michigan.

== Death ==
Tanay died on August 5, 2014, following a lengthy battle with prostate cancer. He was 86.

== Books ==
- American Legal Injustice: Behind the Scenes with an Expert Witness. 2010, Jason Aronson.
- Passport to Life: Autobiographical Reflections on the Holocaust. 2004, Forensic Press.
- The Murderers: 1976, Bobbs-Merrill.

== Hoax ==
A fictional report "A German's View on Islam" falsely attributed to Dr. Tanay is often quoted in relation to Islamist terrorism.
