= Miechów =

Town in Lesser Poland Voivodeship, Poland

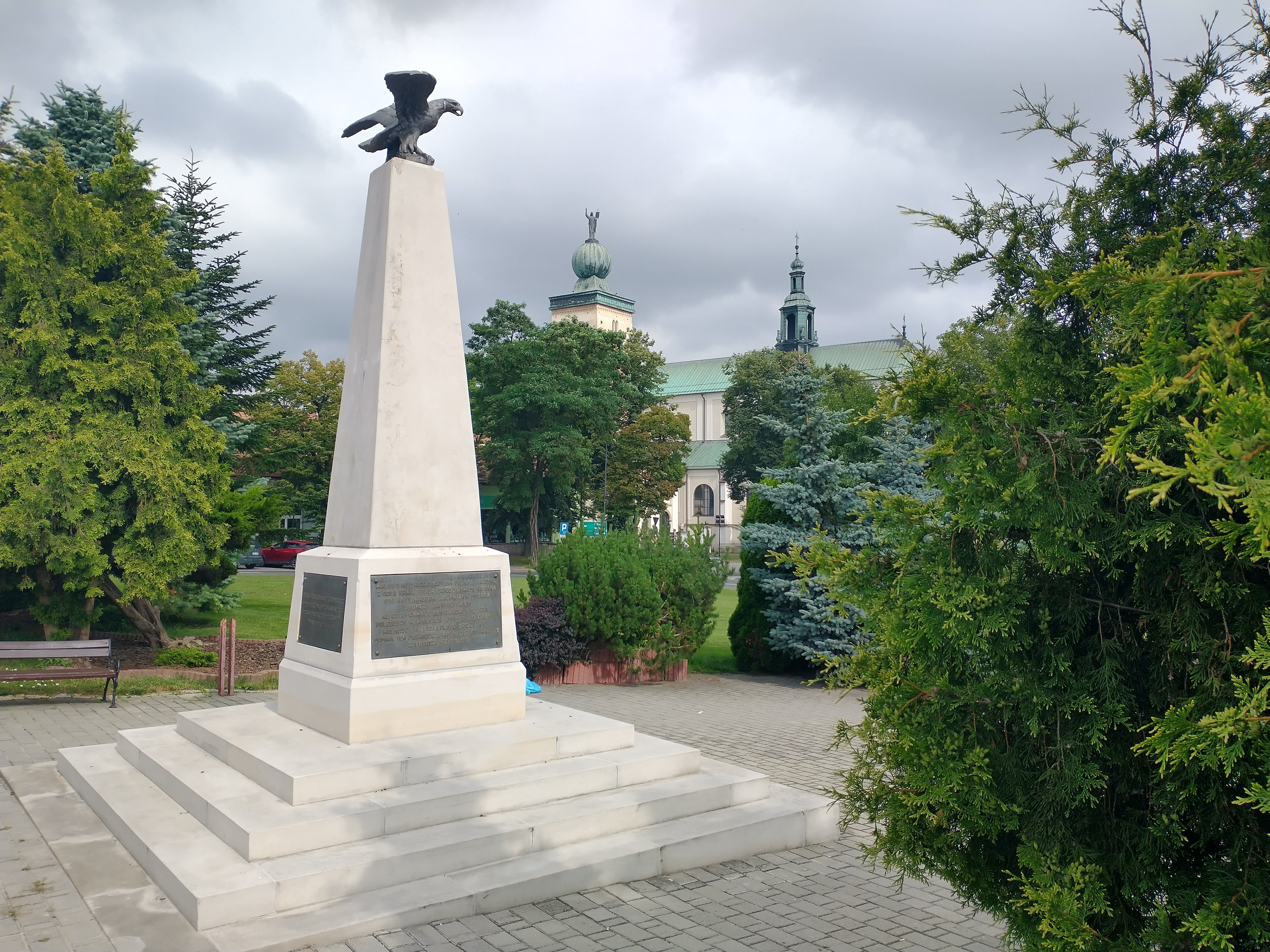
- Market Square with the Church of the Holy Sepulchre in background

- Coat of arms

- Location within Poland
- Coordinates: 50°21′28″N 20°1′57″E
- Country: Poland
- Voivodeship: Lesser Poland
- County: Miechów
- Gmina: Miechów

Government
  - Mayor: Dariusz Marczewski

Area
  - Total: 15.49 km^{2} (5.98 sq mi)

Population (2010)
  - Total: 11,497
  - Density: 742.2/km^{2} (1,922/sq mi)
- Time zone: UTC+1 (CET)
  - Summer (DST): UTC+2 (CEST)
- Postal code: 32–200
- Car plates: KMI
- Website: https://www.miechow.eu/

Miechów [ˈmʲɛxuf] is a town in southern Poland, in Lesser Poland Voivodeship, about 40 kilometres (25 miles) north of Kraków. It is the capital of Miechów County. Population is 11,852 (2004). Miechów lies on the Miechówka river, along European route E77, and has a rail station, located on the main railroad which connects Kraków with Warsaw.

== History ==
=== Early history ===
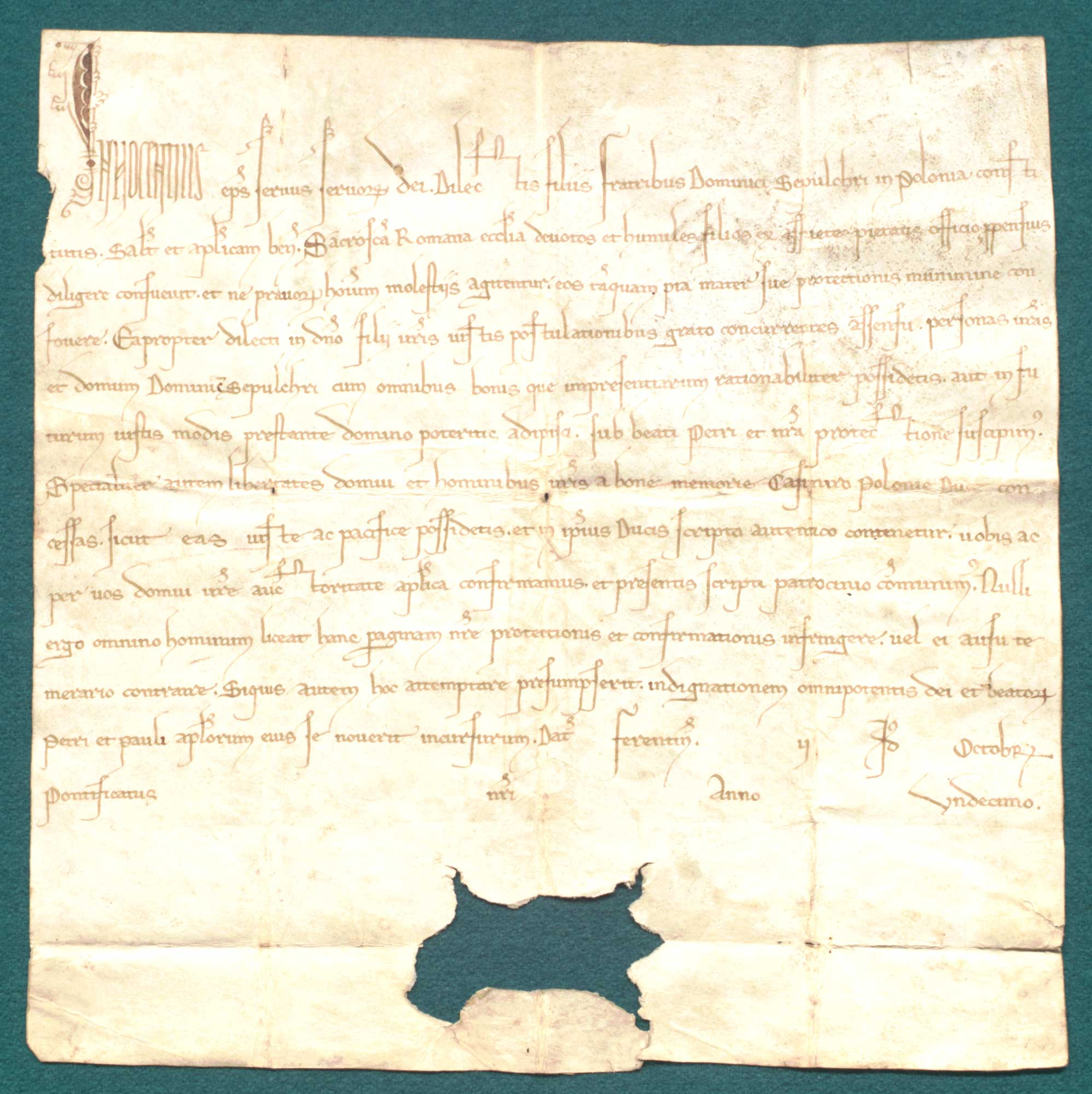
A document of Pope Innocent III from 1208 confirming the grants of Casimir II the Just to the Canons Regular of the Holy Sepulchre in Miechów

In the Early Middle Ages, the area of Miechów belonged to the medieval Polish tribe of the Vistulans. In the late 10th century, it became part of the emerging Polish state. The beginning of Miechów dates back to the year 1163, when a Polish Duke of Pomerania Jaksa of the House of Griffins, who owned the village, invited monks of the Order of the Holy Sepulchre. Apart from Miechów, prince Jaksa handed two other villages to the order.

The new church with a monastery was blessed by the Bishop of Kraków Gędka in 1170. Miechów took advantage of the presence of the order. The settlement expanded together with the abbey, and in 1290 prince Przemysł II granted it the town charter based on Magdeburg rights. Despite convenient location along merchant routes, Miechów grew very slowly, due to numerous wars and conflicts. In the early 14th century, the town was burned down by Prince of Masovia Bolesław, who supported Władysław Łokietek. This incident took place during the Rebellion of wójt Albert, in which the town and the abbey supported the rebels. As a result, the monks were forced to leave Poland for a few years. After their return, King Łokietek banned Germans from the post of the abbot of the monastery. In the second half of the 15th century Miechów burned several times, and in the early 16th century, it had 70 houses. In 1525 the abbey was expanded, when Chapel of Tomb of Christ was built. Pilgrims from all over Poland began to come here. Miechów had a wooden town hall in the market square.

=== Late modern period ===
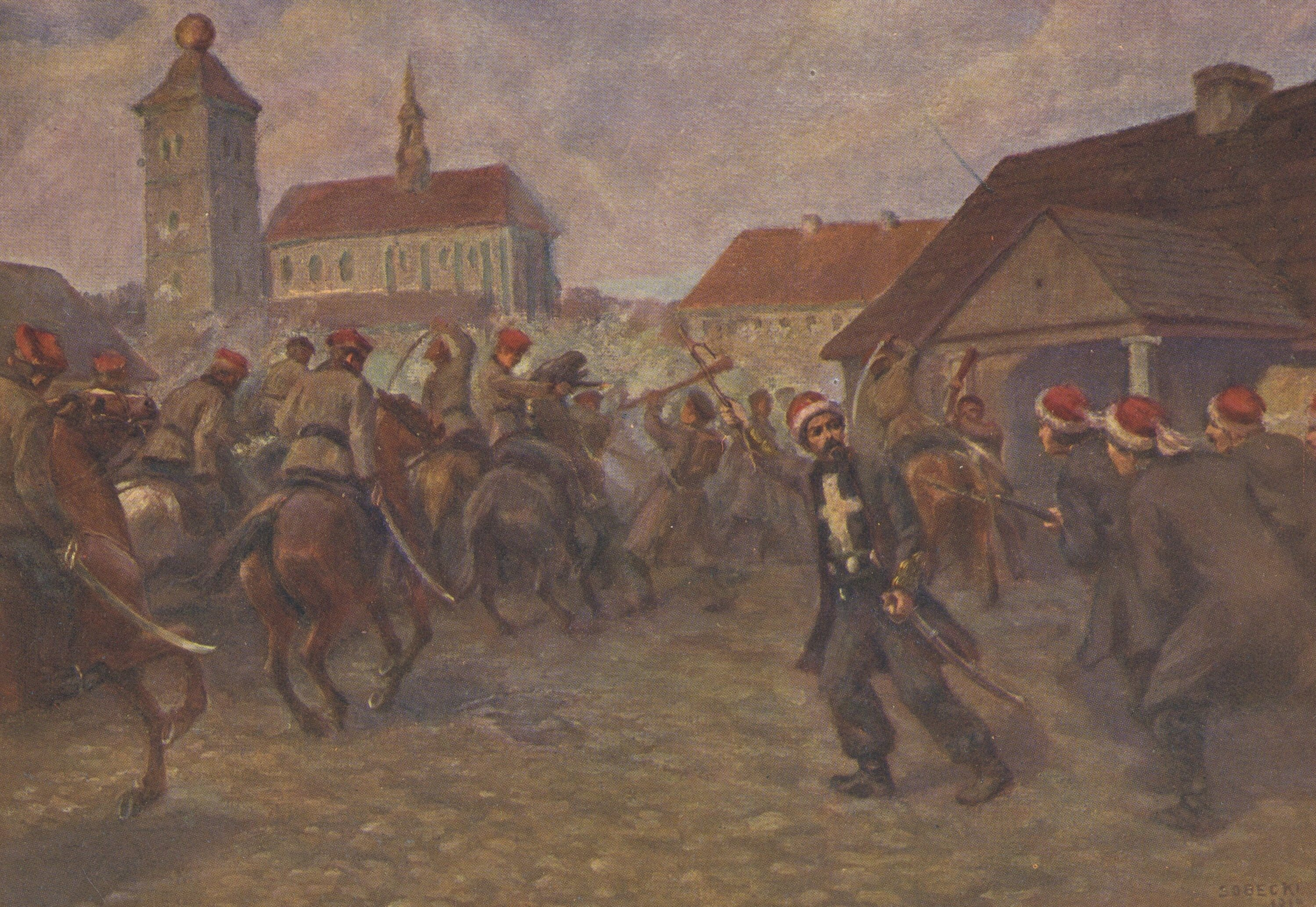
Russian assault on Miechów in 1863

In 1790, the population of Miechów was 1,300. The town was annexed by Austria in Third Partition of Poland in 1795. After the Polish victory in the Austro-Polish War of 1809, it became part of the short-lived Duchy of Warsaw, and after the duchy's dissolution in 1815, it fell to the Russian-controlled Congress Poland. It was the seat of a county in Kraków Voivodeship, and on January 16, 1816, Miechów became the capital of the voivodeship, as the city of Kraków itself did not belong to the Russian Empire. A few months later, on August 6, 1816, the capital of the province was moved to Kielce. In 1830, a modern road was completed from Warsaw to Kraków; furthermore, small enterprises were opened in Miechów. During the January Uprising (Feb. 17, 1863), Polish rebels tried to seize the town, but failed. In retribution, Russian soldiers set Miechów on fire, after which its population was reduced by 50%. In 1885 Miechów received a rail connection with Dąbrowa Górnicza and Kielce, due to a station at a nearby village of Charsznica.

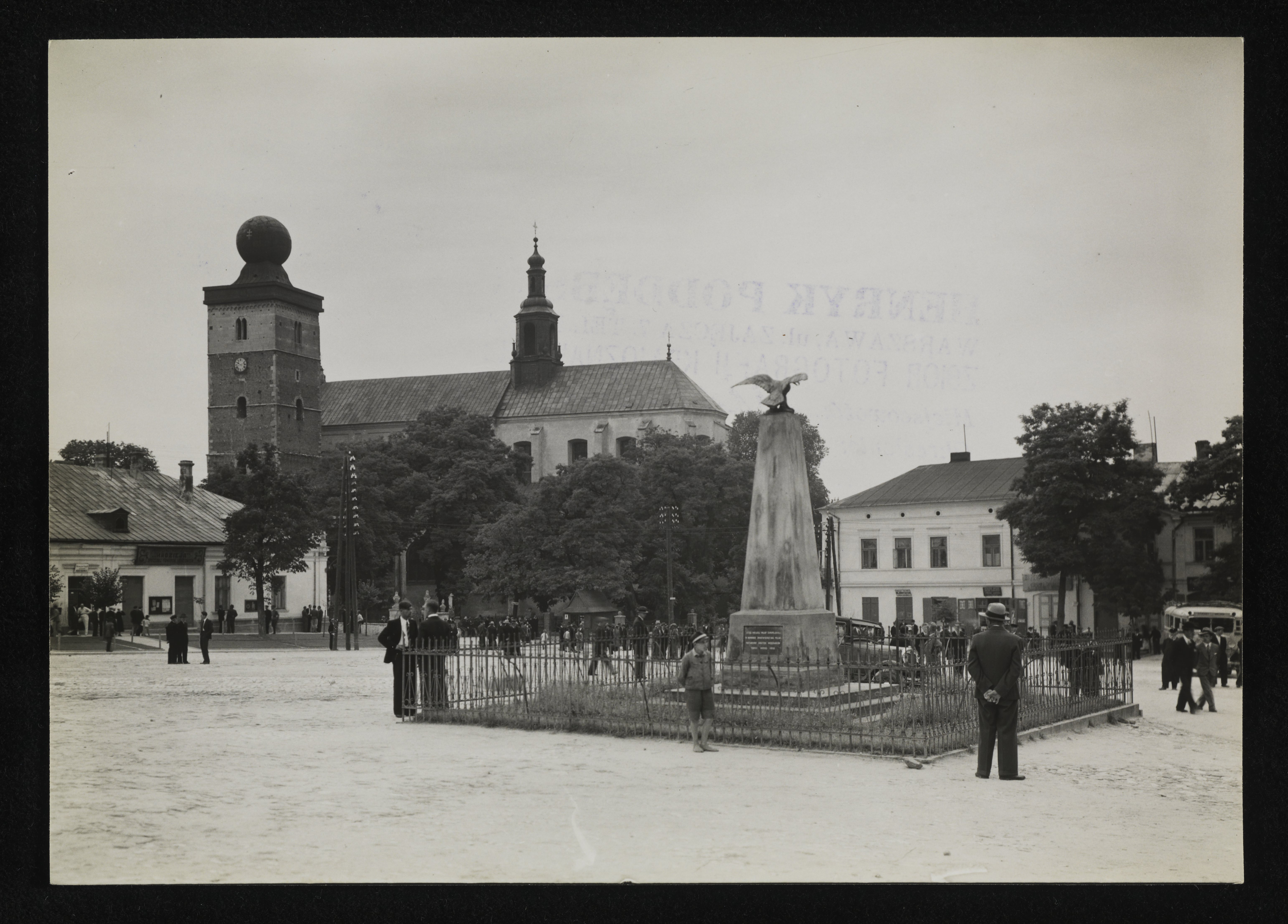
Main square in c. 1936

On August 8, 1914, soldiers of the First Cadre Company entered Miechów, on their way to Kielce. The town remained under Austrian occupation until November 1918, when Poland regained independence. In the interwar period, it was a county seat in the Kielce Voivodeship. In 1934, the government of the Second Polish Republic completed the rail line from Kraków to Tunel, which provided direct connection between Kraków and Warsaw. As a result, Miechów finally received its own train station.

=== World War II ===
During World War II, first Wehrmacht units entered Miechów on September 6, 1939. Under German occupation the town belonged to Kraków District of the General Government.

Monument to Polish partisans of the Miechów area from World War II

Miechów was an important center of the Polish resistance movement. The Miechów inspectorate of the Home Army, comprising three districts (Miechów, Olkusz and Pińczów), covered three pre-war counties and several other towns.

From the beginning of its occupation, Germans terrorized the Jewish population, robbing them of their possessions, kidnapping them for forced labour, and one night in April 1940, breaking into homes, attacking men and raping women, and then forcing the Jews to burn holy books in a bonfire and to sing and dance around it. In March 1941, Jews were forced into a ghetto which also included Jews from some surrounding villages. They could take only what they could carry into their new residences. In August 1942, 600 sick and elderly Jews were taken to Słomniki where they were held without food and water for several days and then some were shot on the spot and dumped into open pits. Some were sent to labor camps. Others were sent to the Belzec extermination camp where they were murdered immediately. In September 1942, German police units surrounded the ghetto and forced Jews to a field near the train station. Jews from other nearby towns were also taken there. From the thousands assembled, 800 or so men were sent to labor camps. The rest were sent to Belzec in trains coated with lime. Only a few Miechów Jews survived of the 2500 who lived there at the beginning of the war.

Three Polish policemen and the commander of the local recruitment office were murdered by the Russians in the Katyn massacre in 1940.

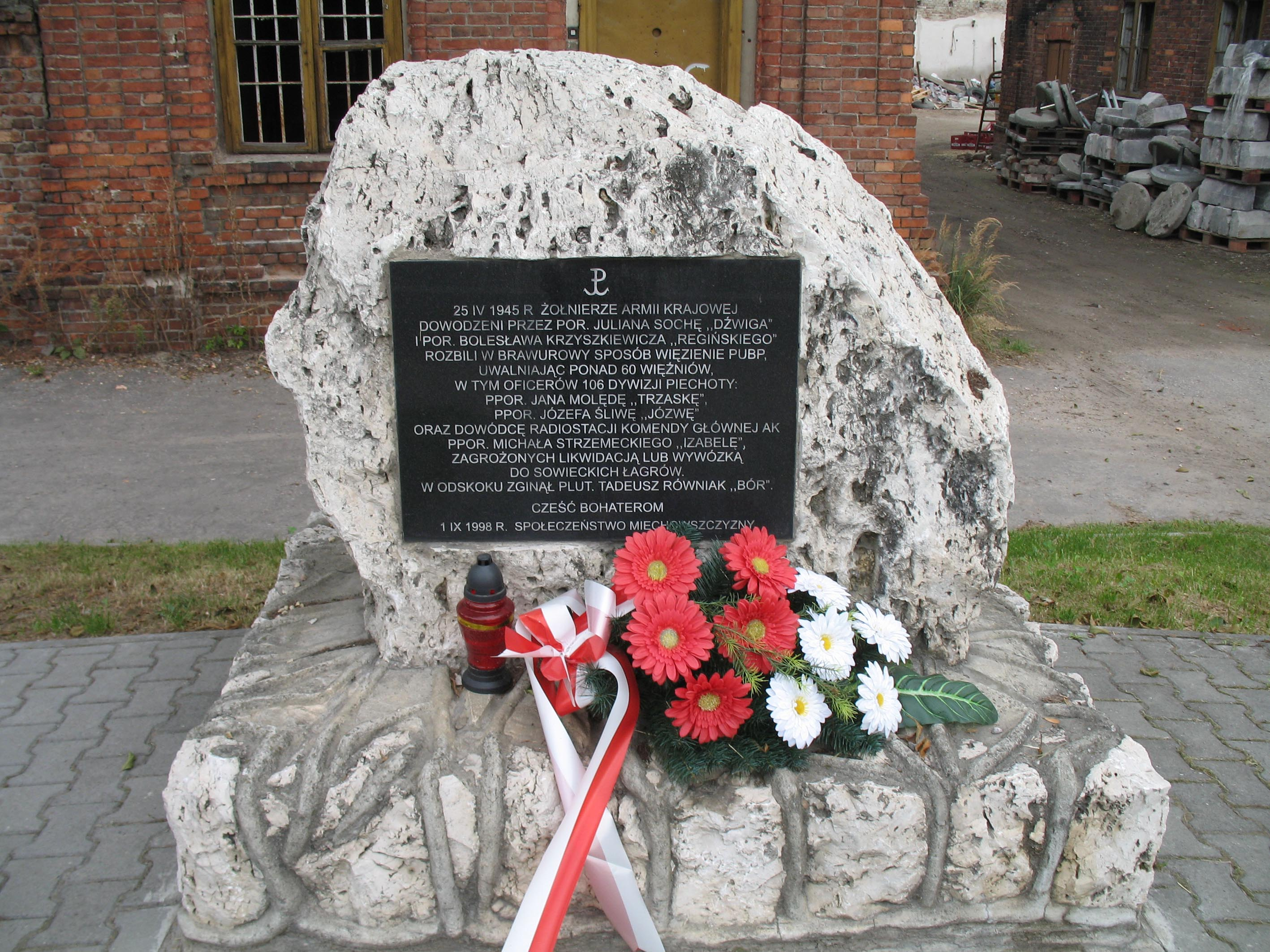
Memorial to the liberation of a communist prison by the Polish resistance movement in 1945

Germans retreated on January 16, 1945 so quickly, that the town was not destroyed. The town returned to Poland, although with a Soviet-installed communist regime, which stayed in power until the Fall of Communism in the 1980s. In the following years, the Polish anti-communist resistance was active in the town, including the nationwide NIE, Home Army and Armed Forces Delegation for Poland, and the local WiN Anti-Bolshevik Militia, "Chirurg" Operational Group and Polish Association of Knights Fighting for Freedom. On 25 April 1945, the Polish resistance broke into the communist prison and liberated over 60 prisoners.

After the war, Miechów was transferred from Kielce Voivodeship to Kraków Voivodeship. It was the seat of a large county, with such towns, as Proszowice, Słomniki and Książ Wielki.

== Demographics ==
Historical population

Year	Pop.	±%
1921	5,699	—
1931	6,360	+11.6%
1939	6,820	+7.2%
1950	6,221	−8.8%

Year	Pop.	±%
1960	6,907	+11.0%
1978	9,816	+42.1%
1988	11,314	+15.3%
2010	11,497	+1.6%

== Sights ==
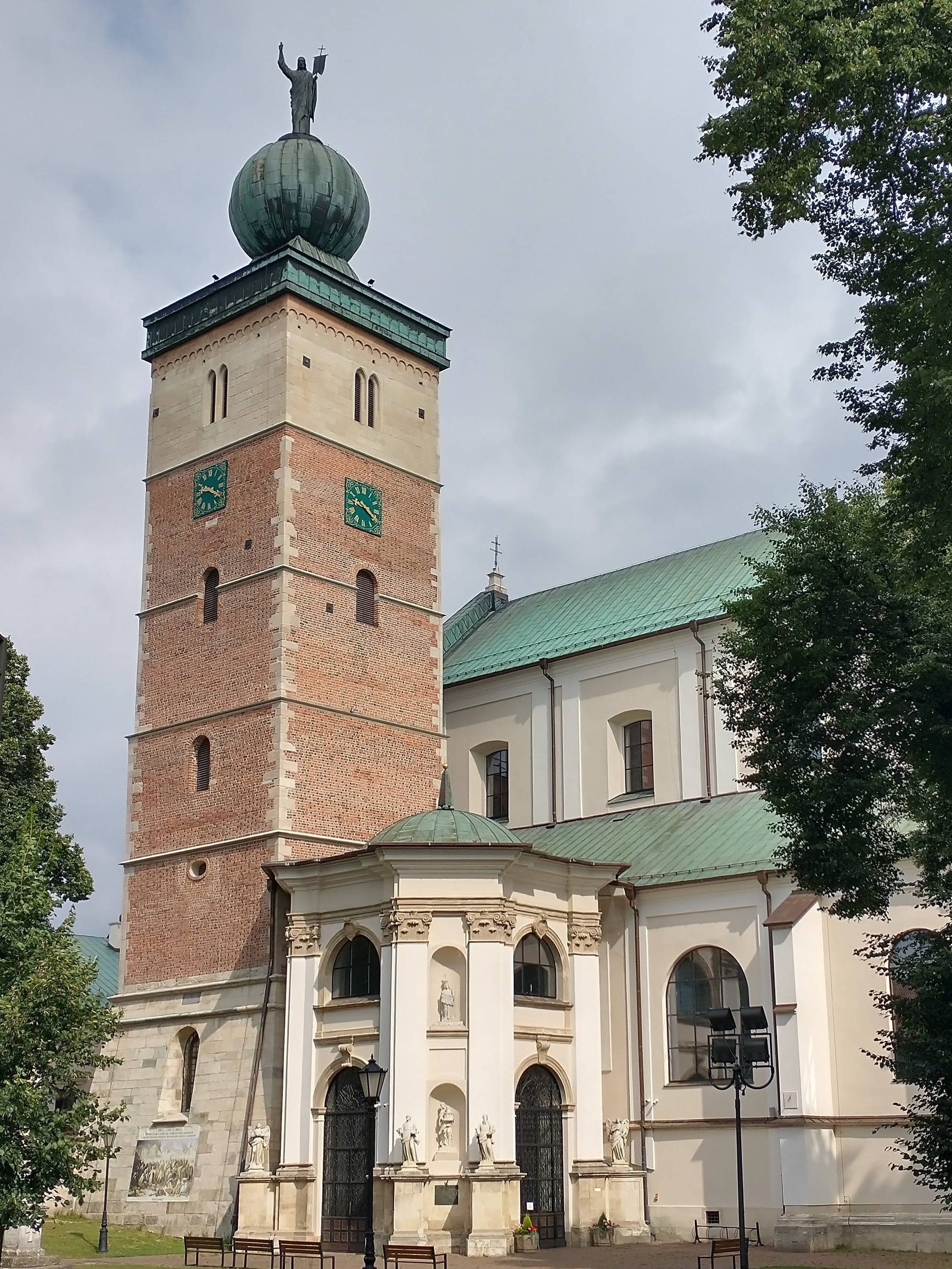
Collegiate Basilica of the Holy Sepulchre

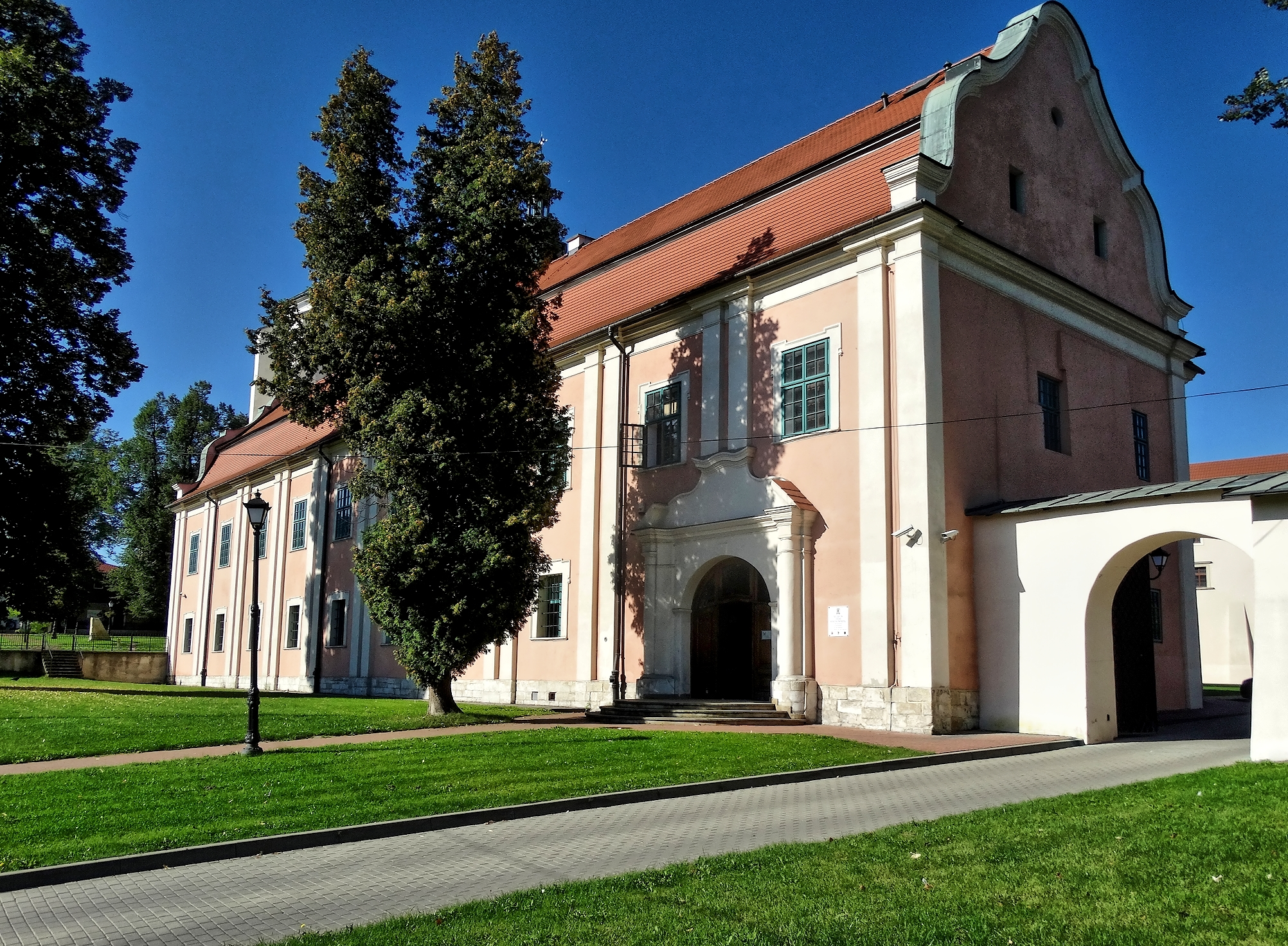
Museum of Miechów Land

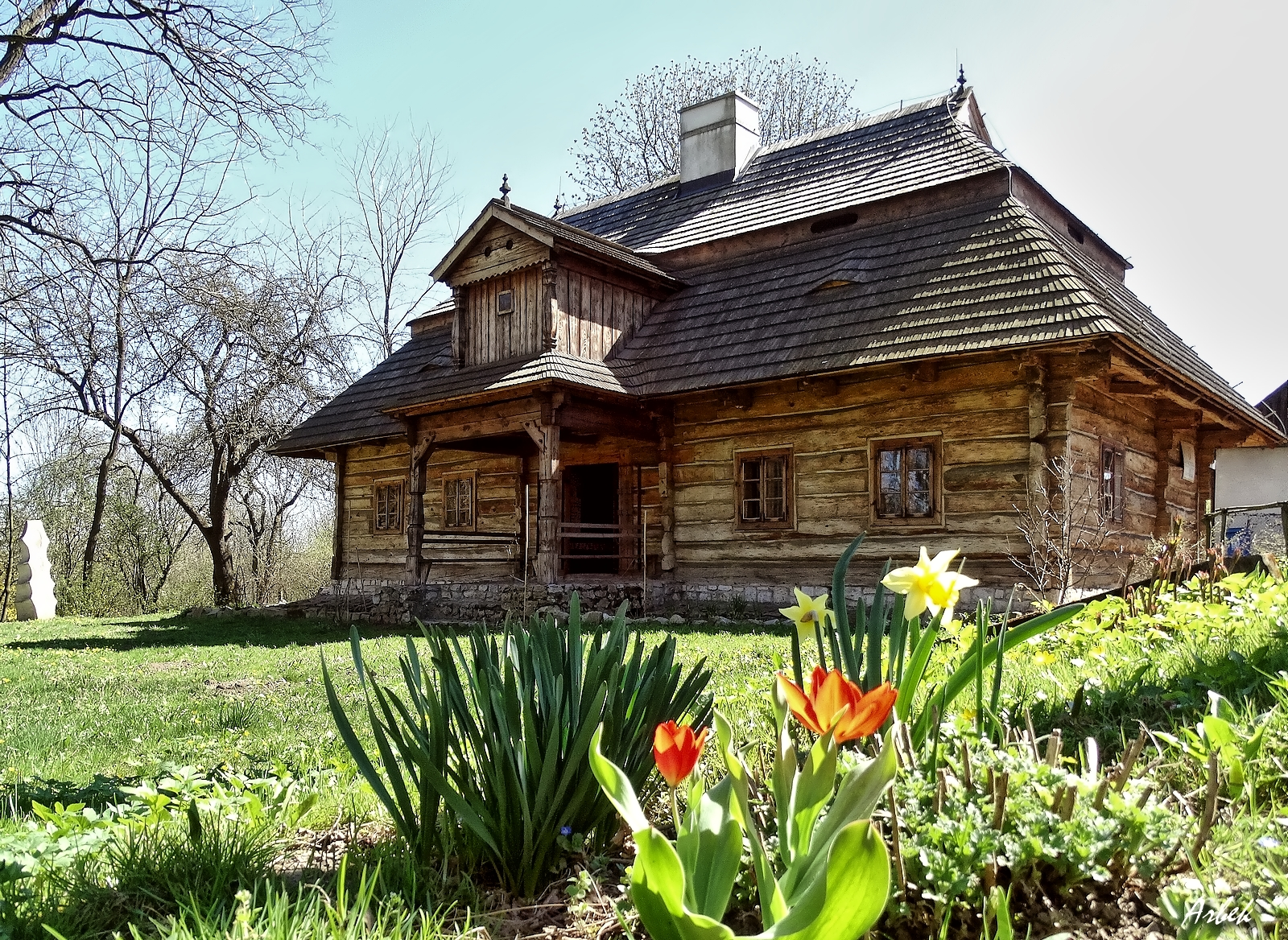
Zacisze manor house

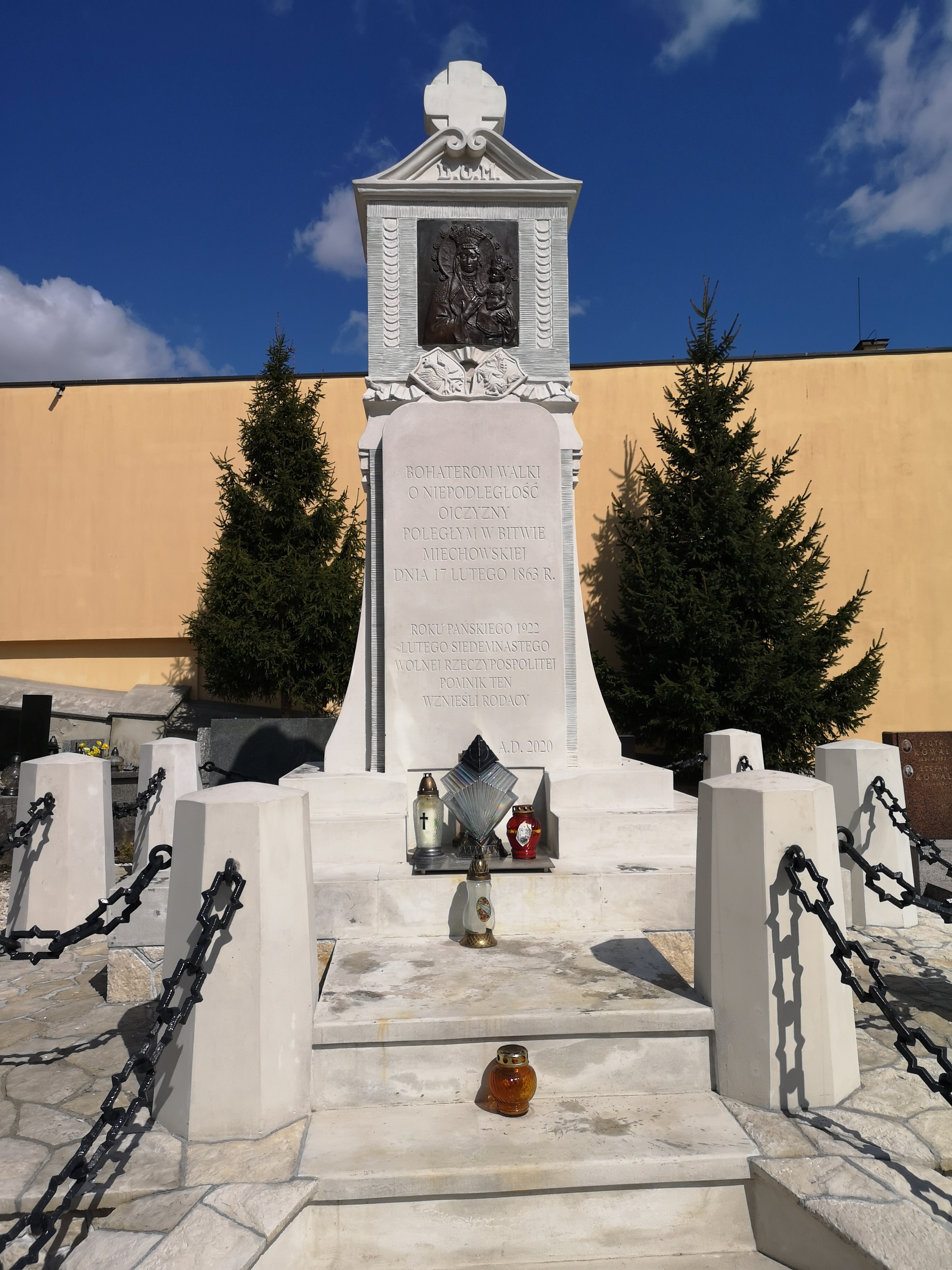
Monument to the Battle of Miechów of 1863

The most important local landmark is the Collegiate Basilica of the Holy Sepulchre with the adjacent monastery of the Canons Regular of the Holy Sepulchre, founded in 1163. The monastery introduced the cult of the Holy Sepulchre in Poland. The monastery hosts the Museum of Miechów Land (Muzeum Ziemi Miechowskiej), which possesses a rich collection of centuries-old vestments, liturgical objects, and books, as well as an exhibition dedicated to Poland's national liberation struggles.

Other sights include the late medieval Church of the Holy Cross, also built by the Canons Regular of the Holy Sepulchre, the wooden manor house Zacisze, built in the 1780s, which contains a historical exhibition, the Stefan Żechowski House of Creative Work, which contains work of local painter and stamp designer Stefan Żechowski, the U Jaksy contemporary art gallery, and several memorials to notable people, heroes and victims of World War II, etc.

The Jewish synagogue, built in the early 20th century, was devastated by the Nazi German occupiers during World War II, and after the war became municipal property, no longer serving its religious purpose. At present, the completely rebuilt synagogue houses a popular café.

== Sports ==
The local football club is Pogoń Miechów, which competes in the lower leagues, whereas the Miechów Culture and Sports Center has basketball, volleyball, cycling, karate, and chess departments, as well as an indoor swimming pool.

== Notable people ==
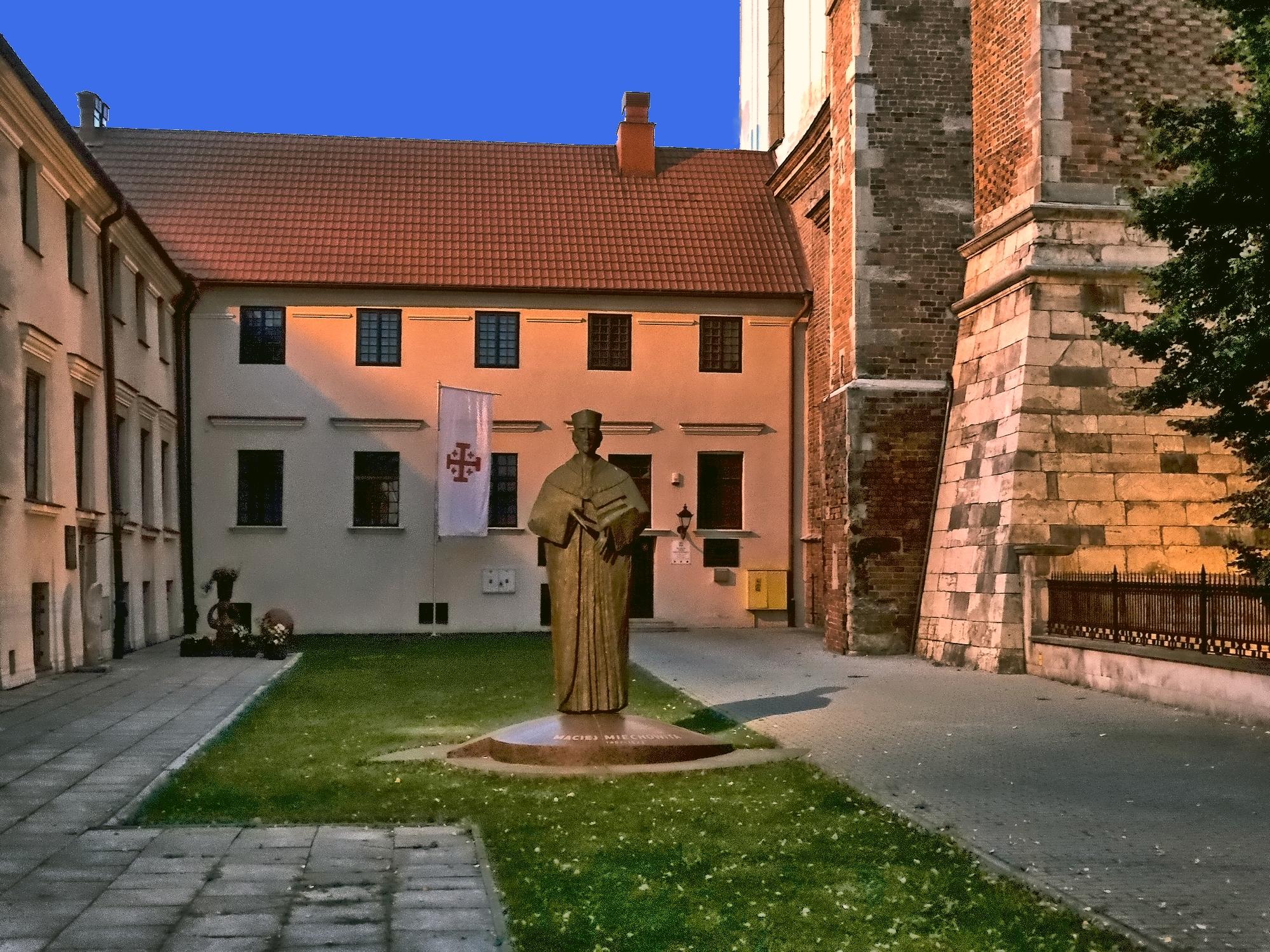
Maciej Miechowita monument

- Maciej Miechowita (1457–1523), Polish Renaissance scholar, doctor of medicine, canon, astrologist, historian, who was elected eight times as Rector of the Academy of Kraków. He's the author of the "Tractatus de duabus Sarmatiis" (Treatise on the Two Sarmatias), considered the first accurate geographical and ethnographical description of Eastern Europe
- Mieczysław Maneli (1922–1994), Polish diplomat and jurist
- Emanuel Tanay (1928–2014), Polish-American physician, forensic psychiatrist
- Maja Chwalińska (born 2001), Polish professional tennis player. First woman to reach the French Open Roland Garros singles final as a qualifier; in the 2026 tournament's main draw.
