= Bellapais Abbey =

13th-century monastery in Northern Cyprus

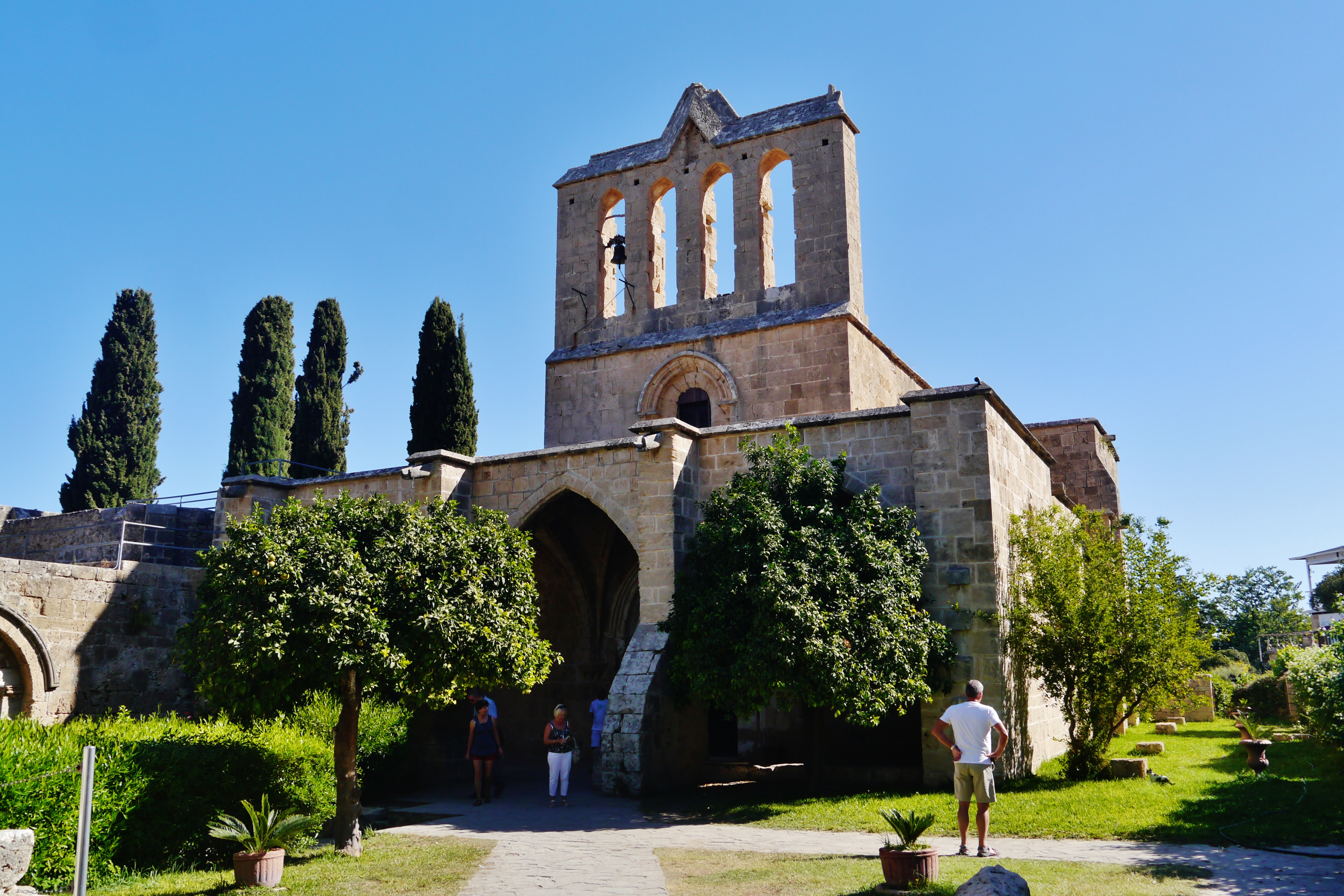

Religion
- Affiliation: Catholic

Location
- Location: Cyprus
- Interactive map of Bellapais Abbey
- Coordinates: 35.3066°N 33.3547°E

Architecture
- Type: Church

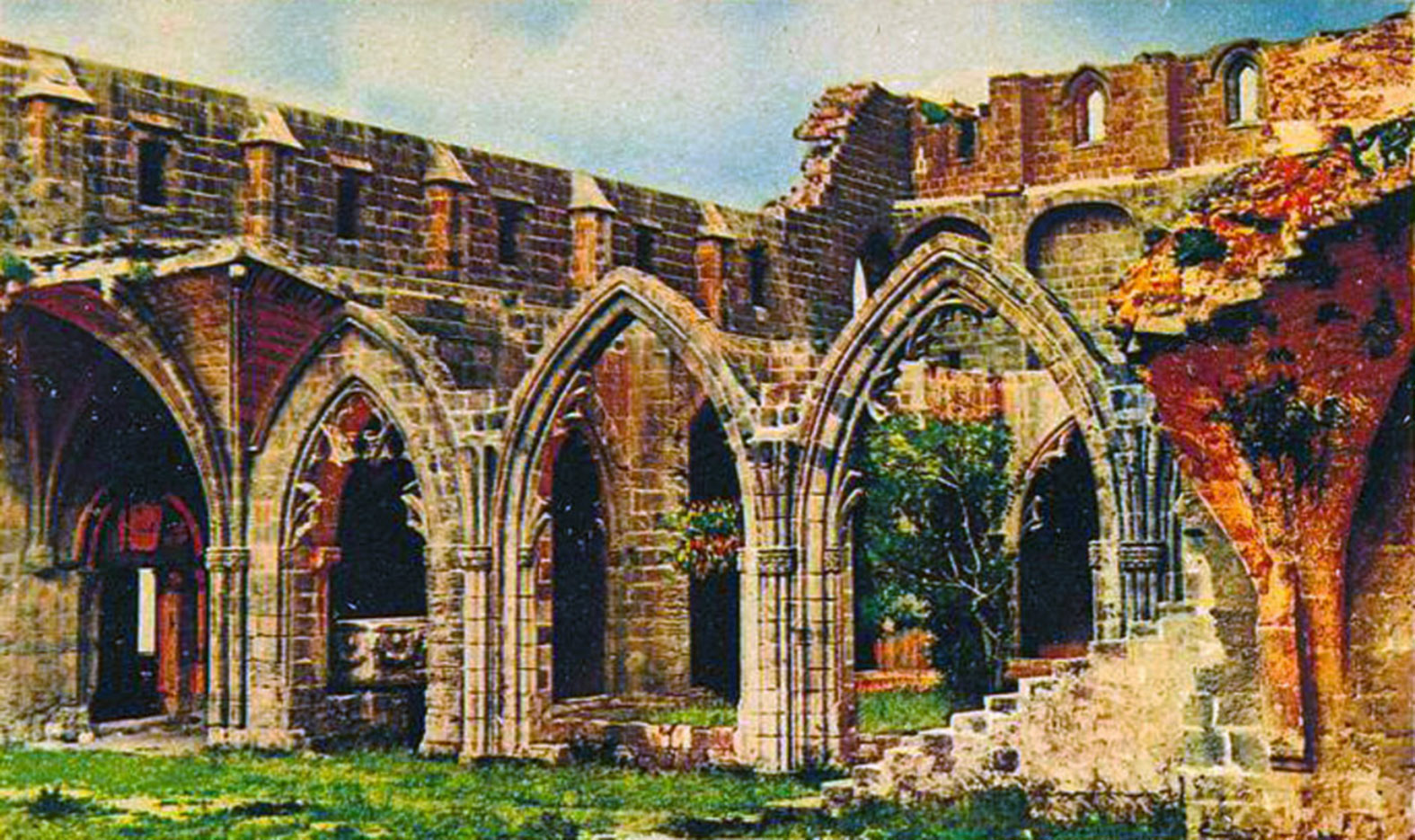
Bellapais Abbey (early 20th century)

Bellapais Abbey (also spelled Bellapaïs) is the ruin of a monastery built by canons regular in the 13th century on the northern side of the small village of Bellapais, in Northern Cyprus, about 5 kilometres (3.1 mi) from Kyrenia. The ruin is at an altitude of 220 m (720 ft) above sea level, and commands a long view down to Kyrenia and the Mediterranean sea.

The site is also a museum, which hosts a restaurant and a cafe. The Abbey's refectory is also a venue for concerts and lectures. In spring and early summer, classic music festivals with international and local stars are held here.

== History ==
The site was formerly named Episcopia or Piscopia, suggesting that it may have served the Bishop of Kyrenia as a residence, and as a place of refuge from Arab raids in the 7th and 8th centuries. The first occupants known to have settled on or near the site were the Canons Regular of the Holy Sepulchre, who had fled Jerusalem after its fall in 1187 to Saladin. The canons had been the custodians of the Church of the Holy Sepulchre.

Aimery de Lusignan founded the monastery, with the first buildings dating to between 1198 and 1205. The abbey was consecrated as the Abbey of St. Mary of the Mountain. The White Canons (Norbertines or Premonstratensians) succeeded the founding canons in 1206. Consequently, documents from the 15th and 16th century refer to Bellapais as the "White Abbey". The common explanation of the modern name Bellapais is that the French name Abbaye de la Paix ("Abbey of Peace") was corrupted after the Italian takeover into "Bellapais", reinterpreted as Bella Paese "Beautiful Land". George Francis Hill was unconvinced of both the French and Italian portions of this derivation. Anne Catherine Emmerich says that this was the ancient Jewish village of "Mallep," visited by Jesus Christ.

The main building present today was built during the rule of King Hugh III (1267–1284). The cloisters and the refectory were constructed during the rule of King Hugh IV between 1324 and 1359. Hugh IV lived in the abbey and had apartments constructed for his use.

In 1373, the Genoese raided Kyrenia, almost destroying Kyrenia Castle. The Genoese stripped Bellapais of anything that was portable and of any value.

By 1489 the Venetians had taken control of Cyprus. By this time, the inhabitants of the Abbey had abandoned the Premonstratensian Rule. Reportedly, canons took wives, and then to keep the business within the family, accepted only their children as novices.

Following the Ottoman conquest of Kyrenia and Kyrenia Castle in 1571, the Ottomans expelled the Premonstratensians and gave the abbey to the Greek Orthodox Church of Cyprus, which they appointed as the only legal Christian church on Cyprus. The Church of Cyprus neglected the Abbey, which fell into disrepair. However, the abbey church itself came to serve as the parish church for the village that grew up around it, and whose inhabitants may have used the abbey as a quarry for stone.

During British rule in Cyprus (1878–1960), the British Army initially took control of Bellapais. In 1878 they cemented the floor of the refectory, which they then used as a hospital. The soldiers also fired off small arms in the refectory, leaving bullet holes in the east wall that remain today. In 1912 George Jeffery, Curator of the Ancient Monuments of Cyprus, undertook repairs of the abbey.

== Structure ==
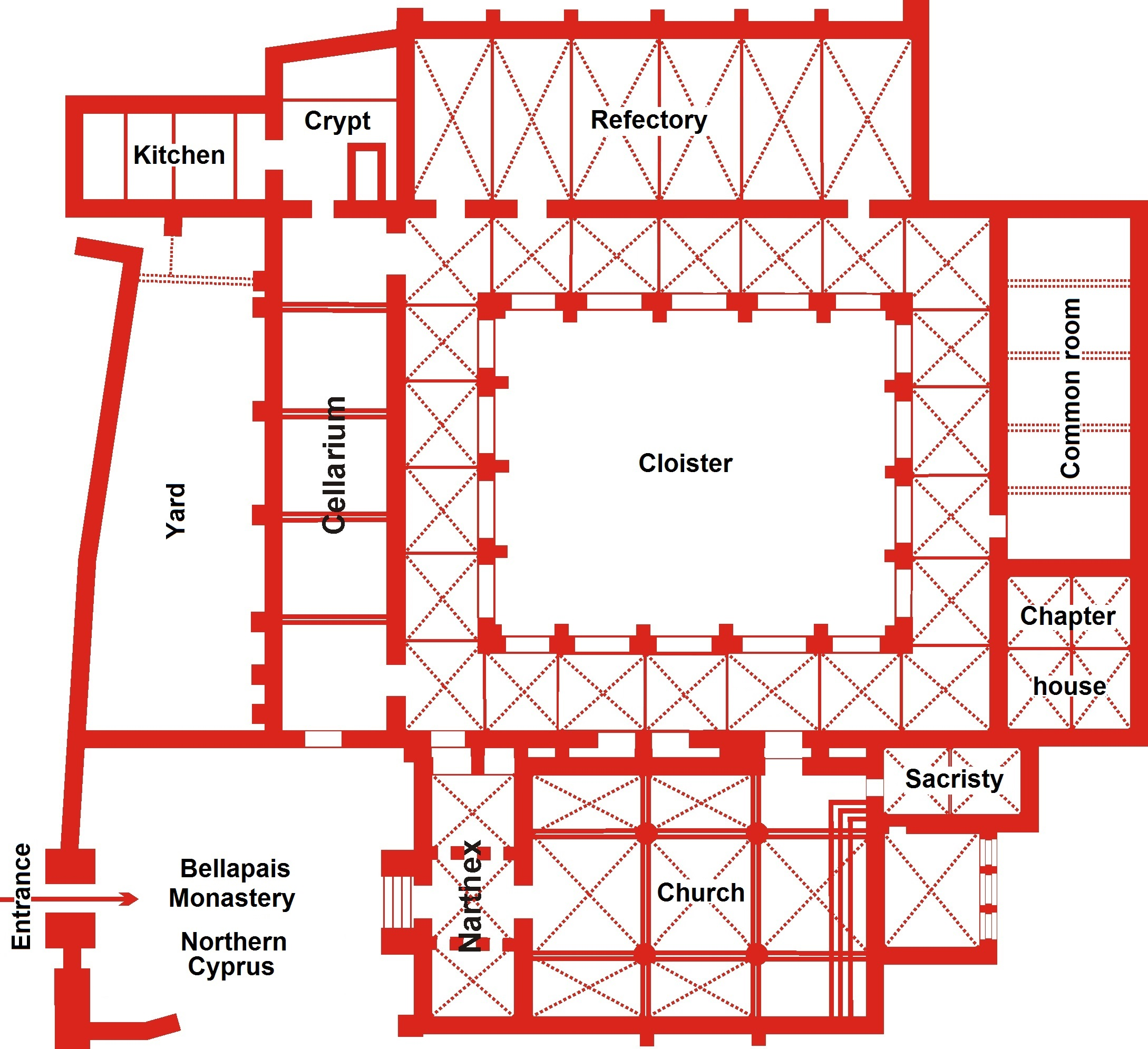
Floor plan of the Abbey

The abbey consists of a church and a cloister, with most of the monastic buildings surrounding the cloister. The monastic buildings are on the north, probably to be cooler, although occasionally the lay of the land dictated position.

The Abbey's main entrance is through a fortified gate on the south side, with a tower that is a later addition, and a forecourt. The gateway replaced an earlier drawbridge.

The church, which dates to the 13th century, borders the courtyard and is the best preserved part of the complex. The church has a flat roof and a belfry, with one surviving bell, above the entrance. The church consists of a nave with two side aisles, a choir and a sacristy. The surviving decorations include an intricately carved pulpit, the bishop's throne, and five chandeliers.

The forecourt leads to the cloister, which has 18 arches. Under one of the arches on the north side there are two Roman sarcophagi that the canons once used as lavabos. The sarcophagi are one above the other, with the upper one being decorated, and the lower one plain. Water flowed from the upper to the lower, and then out a channel to the cloister garden.

Behind the sarcophagi there is a door that leads to the canons' refectory. The door's lintel contains coats of arms of Cyprus, Jerusalem, and the Lusignans. The refectory is Gothic in design. It includes a pulpit that projects from the north wall, six windows on the north wall that illuminate the space, and a rose window on the eastern wall. The room is 30 m (98 ft) long and 10 m (33 ft) wide, with seven columns that extend from the side walls to support the roof. There are six windows. A door on the western wall leads to the kitchen and to a cellar built under the refectory.

The chapter house is on the eastern side of the cloister, as is the undercroft. The chapter house functioned as the abbey's administrative office, and the undercroft contained workrooms. The chapter house has an interesting Gothic stone carving. The carving depicts a man with a double ladder on his back, a second man between two sirens, a woman reading, two beasts attacking a man, a woman with a rosary, a monkey and a cat in the foliage of a pear tree under which there is a man holding a shield, and a canon wearing a cloak. The canons' cells were on a second floor, above the chapter house and the undercroft.

There are several stairs from the cloisters. Three give access to the roof. On the south side of the cloister there is a pair of stairs that lead to the abbey's treasury room, which is in the northwest corner of the monastery.

== See also ==
- Hayton of Corycus
