= Torralba (surname) =

Torralba is a surname, and people with this surname include:

- Eduardo Torralba Beci (1881–1929), Spanish journalist and politician
- Ramón Torralba (1895–1986), Spanish football player
- Unique Torralba Salonga (born 2000), Filipino musician known as Unique (musician)

== See also ==
- Torralba (disambiguation)
