= Church of the Holy Sepulchre, Miechów =

14th-century Gothic basilica in Miechów, Poland

Coordinates: 50°21′27″N 20°01′36″E

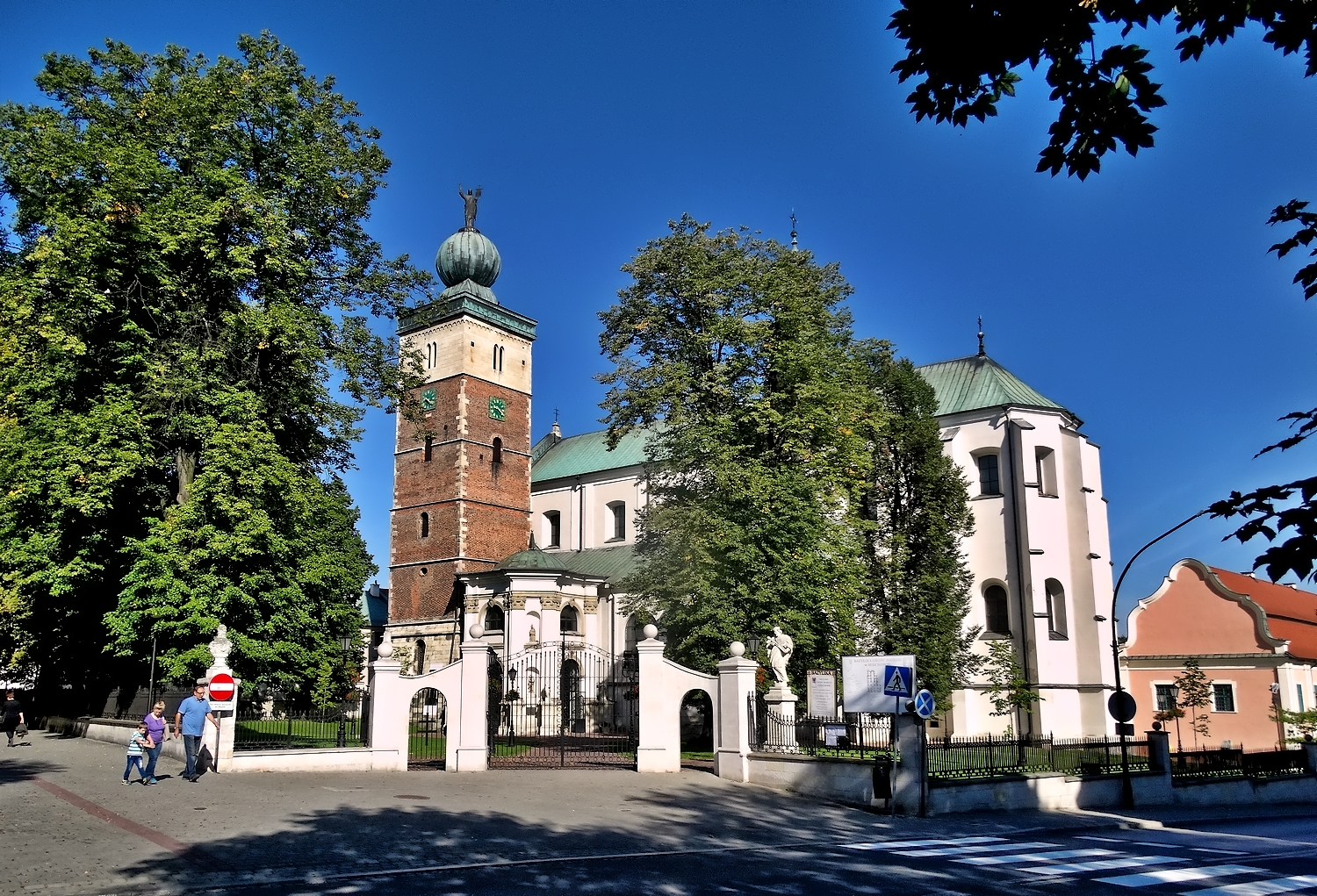
The Church of the Holy Sepulchre

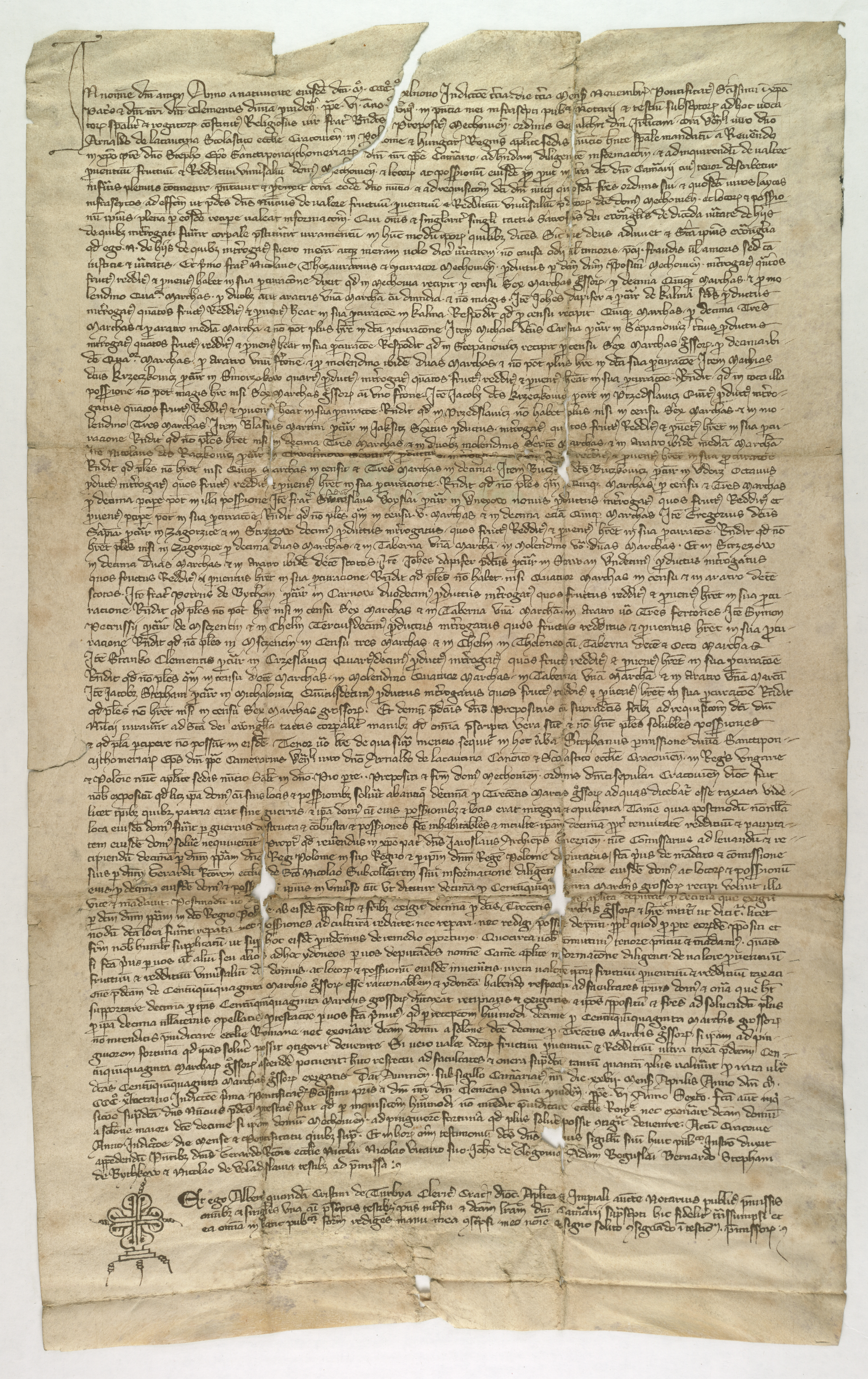
Witness statements of income of the monastery before the papal nuncio in 1349.

The Church of the Holy Sepulchre (Polish: Bazylika Grobu Bożego) in Miechów, Poland, is a 14th-century Gothic basilica, with a nave and two aisles, incorporating some 13th-century Romanesque stonework. It received many privileges from Casimir of Bytom.

Damaged by a fire, it was rebuilt in the late-Baroque style in the second half of the 18th century. The premise has been associated with the Equestrian Order of the Holy Sepulchre.

== History ==
The origin and history of the church and monastery of the Canons of the Holy Sepulchre in Miechów, the oldest foundation of the Order outside of the Holy Land, date back to the 12th century. The monks guarding the Holy Sepulchre in Jerusalem were brought to Miechów, a town 35 km north to Kraków, by the knight and crusader, Jaksa Gryfita in 1163. After the ultimate fall of the Kingdom of Jerusalem to the Muslims in 1291, the Superior of the convent at Miechów took the title of General of the Order, later claiming the style of Grand Prior and Miechów became the headquarters of the Equestrian Order of the Holy Sepulchre for centuries.

The order initiated the custom of setting up, decorating, and visiting Christ’s graves on the last days of the Passion Week. It was in Miechow that the oldest replica of the Holy Sepulchre in Europe, the goal of numerous pilgrims, has been preserved.
