= Torralba de Arciel =

- Location in Spain
- Coordinates: 41°37′17″N 2°15′39″W
- Country: Spain
- Province: Soria
- Municipality: Gómara
- Elevation: 987 m (3,238 ft)

Population (2017)
  - Total: 17
- Time zone: UTC+1 (CET)
  - Summer (DST): UTC+2 (CEST)

Torralba de Arciel is a village under the local government of the municipality of Gómara, in Soria, Spain. The village had 37 inhabitants in 2000.
