= Candilichera =

- Municipality
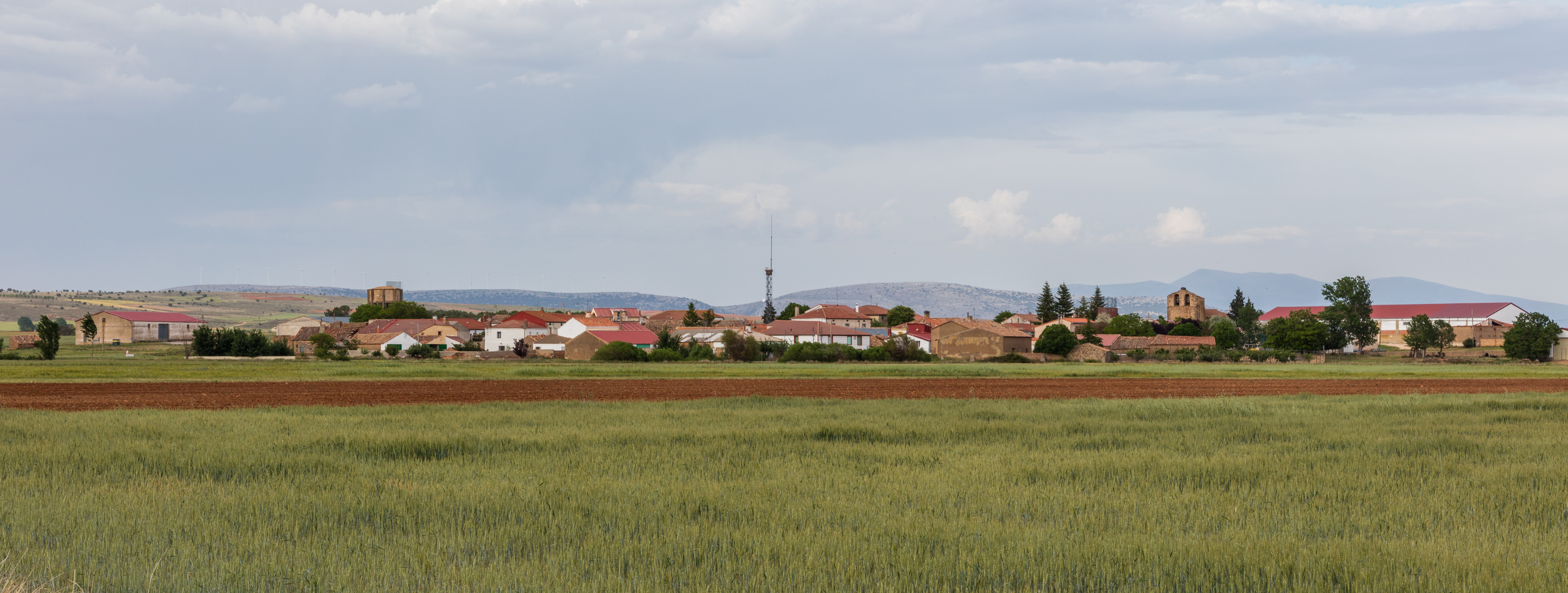
- View of Candilichera, Soria, Spain

- Coat of arms

- Location in Spain. Candilichera (Spain)
- Country: Spain
- Autonomous community: Castile and León
- Province: Soria
- Municipality: Candilichera

Area
  - Total: 44.83 km^{2} (17.31 sq mi)
- Elevation: 1,004 m (3,294 ft)

Population (2025-01-01)
  - Total: 99
  - Density: 2.2/km^{2} (5.7/sq mi)
- Time zone: UTC+1 (CET)
  - Summer (DST): UTC+2 (CEST)
- Website: Official website

Candilichera is a municipality located in the province of Soria, Castile and León, Spain. According to the 2004 census (INE), the municipality had a population of 204 inhabitants.
