= Gómara, Soria =

Municipality of Spain

Gómara
- Municipality
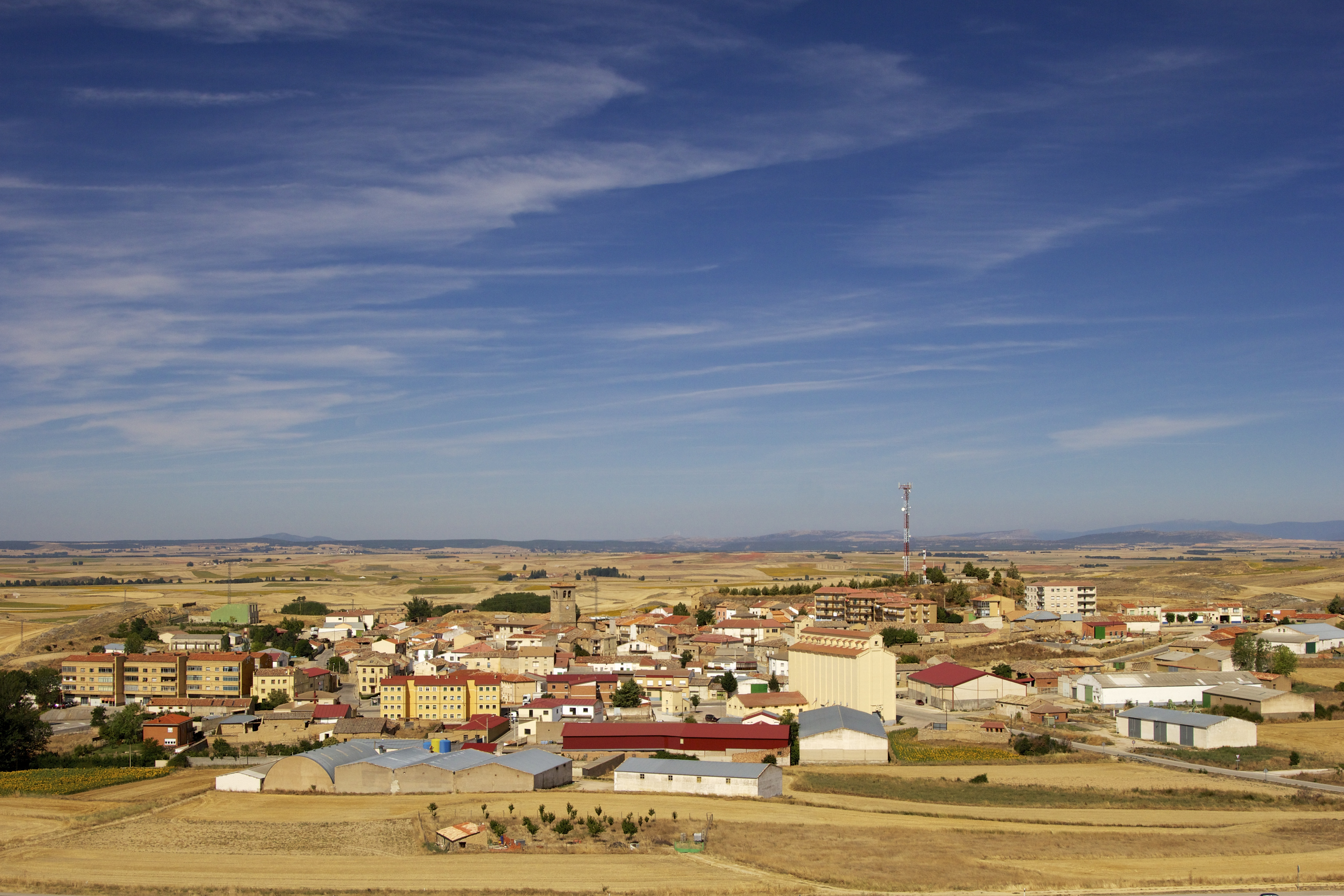

- Coat of arms

- Location in Spain. Gómara (Spain)
- Coordinates: 41°37′23″N 2°13′32″W
- Country: Spain
- Autonomous community: Castile and León
- Province: Soria
- Municipality: Gómara

Area
  - Total: 58 km^{2} (22 sq mi)

Population (2025-01-01)
  - Total: 286
  - Density: 4.9/km^{2} (13/sq mi)
- Time zone: UTC+1 (CET)
  - Summer (DST): UTC+2 (CEST)
- Website: Official website

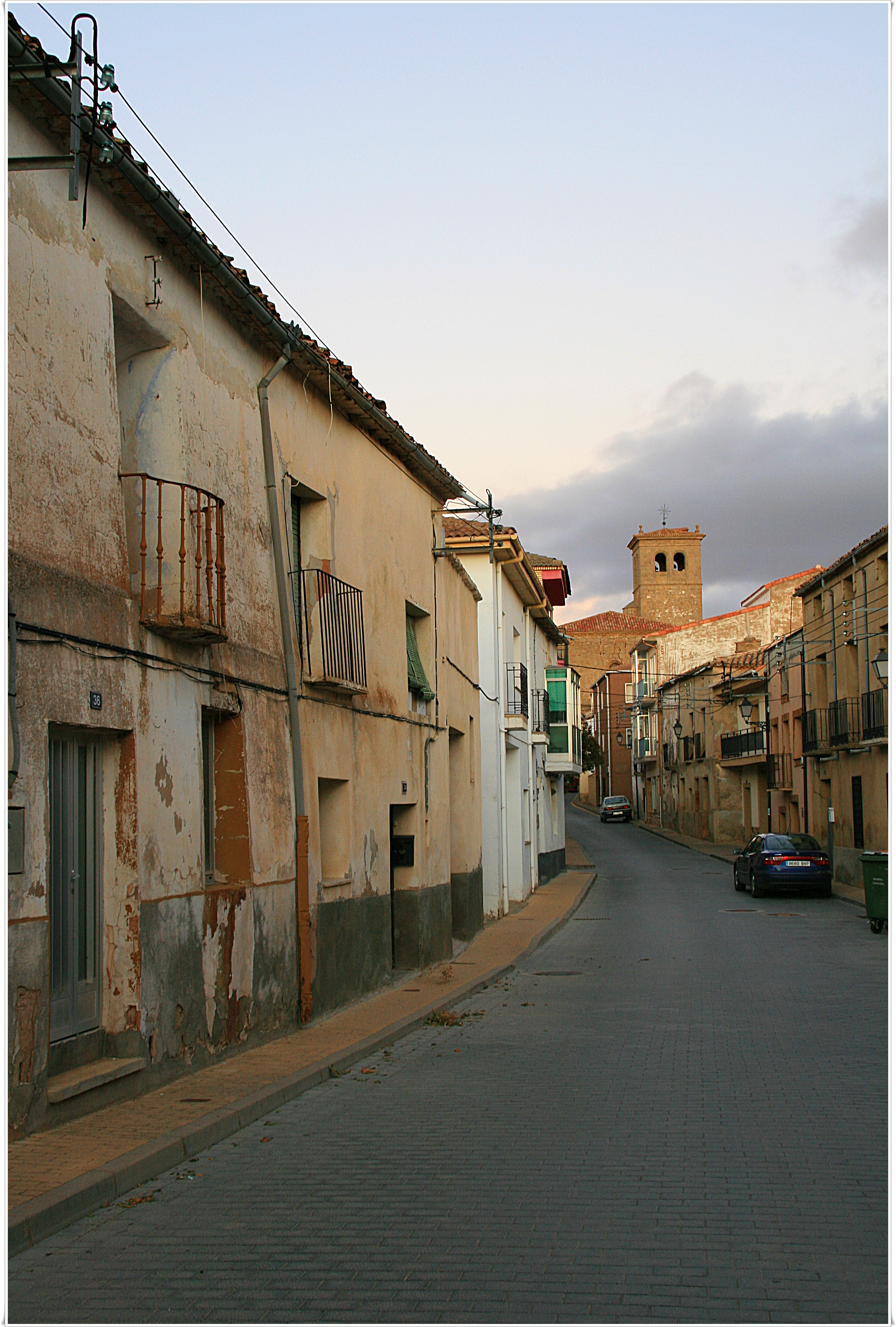
Gómara Main Street

Gómara is a locality and municipality of the province of Soria, judicial district of Soria, autonomous community of Castile and León, Spain. It is the capital of the comarca of Campo de Gómara, and its population is of 397. The municipality includes the village Torralba de Arciel.
