= Torralba de Ribota =

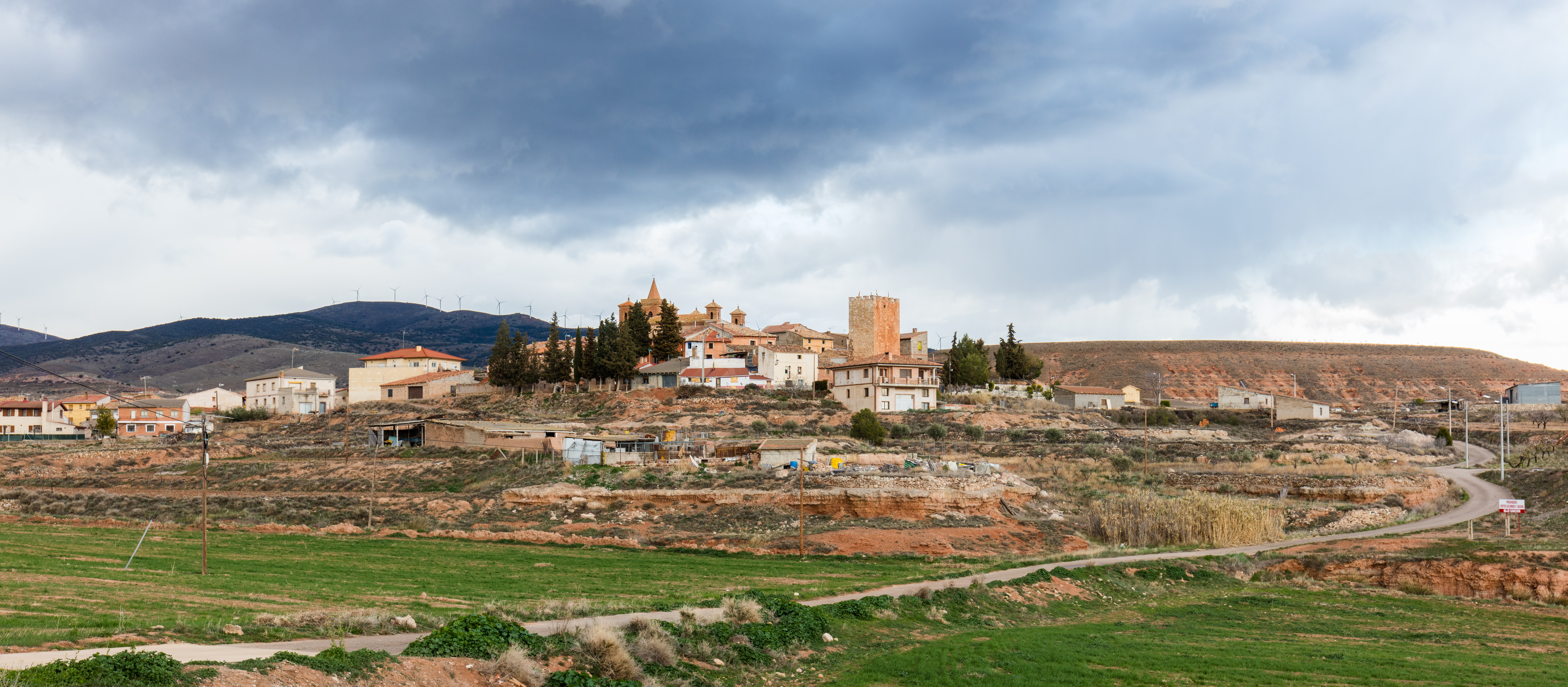
- Torralba de Ribota

- Flag Coat of arms

- Location within Spain
- Coordinates: 41°25′N 1°41′W
- Country: Spain
- Autonomous community: Aragon
- Province: Zaragoza
- Municipality: Ribota

Area
  - Total: 32.5 km^{2} (12.5 sq mi)
- Elevation: 625 m (2,051 ft)

Population (2025-01-01)
  - Total: 157
  - Density: 4.83/km^{2} (12.5/sq mi)
- Time zone: UTC+1 (CET)
  - Summer (DST): UTC+2 (CEST)

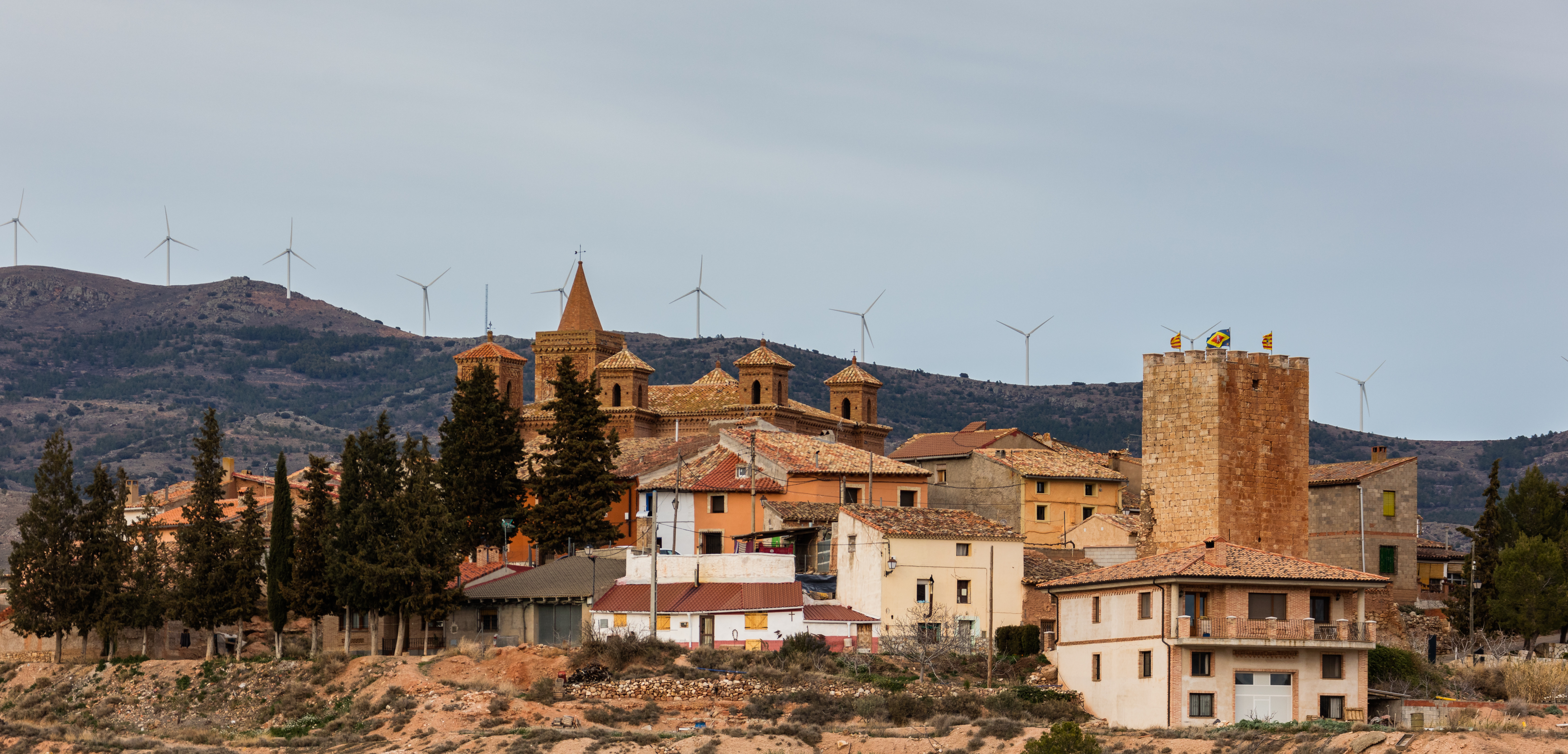
View of Torralba de Ribota with the Sierra de la Virgen in the background

Torralba de Ribota is a municipality located in the province of Zaragoza, Aragon, Spain. According to the 2004 census (INE), the municipality had a population of 189 inhabitants.

== See also ==
- List of municipalities in Zaragoza
